This is a partial list of unnumbered minor planets for principal provisional designations assigned between 16 September and 15 October 2000. , a total of 563 bodies remain unnumbered for this period. Objects for this year are listed on the following pages: A–E · F–O · P–R · S–T and U–Y. Also see previous and next year.

S 

|- id="2000 SK" bgcolor=#fefefe
| 0 || 2000 SK || MBA-I || 18.53 || data-sort-value="0.58" | 580 m || multiple || 2000–2022 || 25 Jan 2022 || 93 || align=left | Disc.: Emerald Lane Obs. || 
|- id="2000 SP" bgcolor=#fefefe
| 1 || 2000 SP || MBA-I || 19.14 || data-sort-value="0.44" | 440 m || multiple || 2000–2021 || 08 Dec 2021 || 44 || align=left | Disc.: SpacewatchAlt.: 2014 UD156 || 
|- id="2000 ST" bgcolor=#fefefe
| 0 || 2000 ST || MBA-I || 18.7 || data-sort-value="0.54" | 540 m || multiple || 2000–2019 || 02 Jun 2019 || 114 || align=left | Disc.: SpacewatchAlt.: 2010 VU162 || 
|- id="2000 SX2" bgcolor=#FA8072
| 0 ||  || MCA || 19.02 || data-sort-value="0.47" | 470 m || multiple || 1993–2021 || 11 Jul 2021 || 44 || align=left | Disc.: AMOSAlt.: 2014 MN46 || 
|- id="2000 SO4" bgcolor=#d6d6d6
| 0 ||  || MBA-O || 16.19 || 3.2 km || multiple || 2000–2021 || 14 Apr 2021 || 88 || align=left | Disc.: Spacewatch || 
|- id="2000 SP4" bgcolor=#E9E9E9
| 0 ||  || MBA-M || 18.0 || 1.1 km || multiple || 2000–2018 || 12 Dec 2018 || 37 || align=left | Disc.: SpacewatchAlt.: 2009 UQ116 || 
|- id="2000 SR7" bgcolor=#FA8072
| – ||  || MCA || 21.6 || data-sort-value="0.14" | 140 m || single || 4 days || 26 Sep 2000 || 9 || align=left | Disc.: Spacewatch || 
|- id="2000 ST7" bgcolor=#fefefe
| 0 ||  || MBA-I || 18.67 || data-sort-value="0.55" | 550 m || multiple || 2000–2021 || 12 May 2021 || 93 || align=left | Disc.: Spacewatch || 
|- id="2000 SV7" bgcolor=#fefefe
| 2 ||  || MBA-I || 19.7 || data-sort-value="0.34" | 340 m || multiple || 2000–2020 || 11 Dec 2020 || 47 || align=left | Disc.: SpacewatchAdded on 22 July 2020 || 
|- id="2000 SX7" bgcolor=#d6d6d6
| 0 ||  || MBA-O || 16.54 || 2.7 km || multiple || 2000–2021 || 29 Oct 2021 || 165 || align=left | Disc.: SpacewatchAlt.: 2015 PR16 || 
|- id="2000 SE8" bgcolor=#FFC2E0
| 6 ||  || APO || 23.0 || data-sort-value="0.089" | 89 m || single || 72 days || 01 Dec 2000 || 36 || align=left | Disc.: AMOSAMO at MPC || 
|- id="2000 SF8" bgcolor=#FFC2E0
| 1 ||  || AMO || 20.3 || data-sort-value="0.31" | 310 m || multiple || 2000–2017 || 09 Oct 2017 || 99 || align=left | Disc.: LINEAR || 
|- id="2000 SG8" bgcolor=#FFC2E0
| 3 ||  || APO || 17.5 || 1.1 km || multiple || 2000–2004 || 15 Sep 2004 || 111 || align=left | Disc.: LONEOSNEO larger than 1 kilometer || 
|- id="2000 SJ8" bgcolor=#FFC2E0
| 1 ||  || AMO || 19.8 || data-sort-value="0.39" | 390 m || multiple || 2000–2013 || 27 Oct 2013 || 68 || align=left | Disc.: LINEAR || 
|- id="2000 SR8" bgcolor=#fefefe
| 0 ||  || MBA-I || 17.9 || data-sort-value="0.78" | 780 m || multiple || 2000–2021 || 18 Jan 2021 || 81 || align=left | Disc.: Prescott Obs.Alt.: 2008 VE23 || 
|- id="2000 SM9" bgcolor=#E9E9E9
| 3 ||  || MBA-M || 17.7 || data-sort-value="0.86" | 860 m || multiple || 2000–2012 || 05 Aug 2012 || 41 || align=left | Disc.: LINEARAlt.: 2004 RA340 || 
|- id="2000 SD10" bgcolor=#FA8072
| 9 ||  || MCA || 18.27 || data-sort-value="0.66" | 660 m || single || 8 days || 02 Oct 2000 || 47 || align=left | Disc.: LINEAR || 
|- id="2000 SL10" bgcolor=#FFC2E0
| 5 ||  || APO || 21.9 || data-sort-value="0.15" | 150 m || single || 69 days || 01 Dec 2000 || 38 || align=left | Disc.: LINEARPotentially hazardous object || 
|- id="2000 SM10" bgcolor=#FFC2E0
| 1 ||  || APO || 24.1 || data-sort-value="0.054" | 54 m || multiple || 2000–2015 || 29 Sep 2015 || 184 || align=left | Disc.: LINEARAlt.: 2015 RF2 || 
|- id="2000 SN10" bgcolor=#FFC2E0
| 4 ||  || AMO || 21.1 || data-sort-value="0.21" | 210 m || single || 61 days || 23 Nov 2000 || 72 || align=left | Disc.: LINEAR || 
|- id="2000 SD11" bgcolor=#E9E9E9
| 2 ||  || MBA-M || 17.0 || 1.7 km || multiple || 2000–2013 || 25 Nov 2013 || 49 || align=left | Disc.: LINEARAlt.: 2010 CD245 || 
|- id="2000 SF11" bgcolor=#E9E9E9
| 0 ||  || MBA-M || 17.54 || 1.3 km || multiple || 2000–2021 || 11 Oct 2021 || 106 || align=left | Disc.: LINEAR || 
|- id="2000 SJ15" bgcolor=#E9E9E9
| 2 ||  || MBA-M || 17.8 || data-sort-value="0.82" | 820 m || multiple || 1996–2020 || 23 Jul 2020 || 73 || align=left | Disc.: LINEARAlt.: 2004 RJ95 || 
|- id="2000 SS20" bgcolor=#FA8072
| 2 ||  || MCA || 19.2 || data-sort-value="0.43" | 430 m || multiple || 2000–2013 || 04 Nov 2013 || 87 || align=left | Disc.: LONEOS || 
|- id="2000 SU20" bgcolor=#FFC2E0
| 4 ||  || AMO || 19.8 || data-sort-value="0.39" | 390 m || single || 88 days || 20 Dec 2000 || 30 || align=left | Disc.: LONEOS || 
|- id="2000 SG21" bgcolor=#E9E9E9
| 1 ||  || MBA-M || 17.3 || 1.5 km || multiple || 1987–2020 || 27 Apr 2020 || 94 || align=left | Disc.: LINEARAlt.: 2013 RB84 || 
|- id="2000 SH21" bgcolor=#d6d6d6
| 0 ||  || MBA-O || 15.94 || 3.6 km || multiple || 2000–2021 || 09 May 2021 || 131 || align=left | Disc.: LINEARAlt.: 2010 NQ66 || 
|- id="2000 SK21" bgcolor=#fefefe
| 0 ||  || MBA-I || 16.77 || 1.3 km || multiple || 1999–2022 || 27 Jan 2022 || 92 || align=left | Disc.: LINEARAlt.: 2010 GT96 || 
|- id="2000 SX23" bgcolor=#E9E9E9
| 0 ||  || MBA-M || 17.27 || 1.5 km || multiple || 2000–2022 || 04 Jan 2022 || 199 || align=left | Disc.: LINEAR || 
|- id="2000 SY23" bgcolor=#E9E9E9
| 0 ||  || MBA-M || 17.68 || 1.2 km || multiple || 2000–2021 || 01 Oct 2021 || 107 || align=left | Disc.: LINEARAlt.: 2013 WS114 || 
|- id="2000 SD24" bgcolor=#FA8072
| E ||  || MCA || 21.1 || data-sort-value="0.18" | 180 m || single || 7 days || 28 Sep 2000 || 11 || align=left | Disc.: LINEAR || 
|- id="2000 SB25" bgcolor=#FFC2E0
| 2 ||  || AMO || 20.5 || data-sort-value="0.28" | 280 m || multiple || 2000–2005 || 25 Oct 2005 || 45 || align=left | Disc.: LINEAR || 
|- id="2000 SP33" bgcolor=#E9E9E9
| 0 ||  || MBA-M || 18.02 || data-sort-value="0.74" | 740 m || multiple || 2000–2021 || 27 Dec 2021 || 93 || align=left | Disc.: LINEAR || 
|- id="2000 SC34" bgcolor=#FA8072
| 0 ||  || MCA || 18.20 || data-sort-value="0.68" | 680 m || multiple || 2000–2021 || 22 Apr 2021 || 107 || align=left | Disc.: LINEARAlt.: 2014 BY36 || 
|- id="2000 SN34" bgcolor=#E9E9E9
| 0 ||  || MBA-M || 17.18 || 1.1 km || multiple || 2000–2021 || 20 Nov 2021 || 302 || align=left | Disc.: LINEAR || 
|- id="2000 SA35" bgcolor=#E9E9E9
| 0 ||  || MBA-M || 16.50 || 2.8 km || multiple || 2000–2021 || 03 May 2021 || 122 || align=left | Disc.: LINEARAlt.: 2014 UB224, 2016 CB57 || 
|- id="2000 SK35" bgcolor=#fefefe
| 0 ||  || MBA-I || 17.77 || data-sort-value="0.83" | 830 m || multiple || 2000–2021 || 13 May 2021 || 93 || align=left | Disc.: LINEAR || 
|- id="2000 SZ37" bgcolor=#FA8072
| 0 ||  || MCA || 18.1 || data-sort-value="0.71" | 710 m || multiple || 2000–2019 || 19 Dec 2019 || 157 || align=left | Disc.: LINEAR || 
|- id="2000 SR43" bgcolor=#FFC2E0
| 1 ||  || AMO || 19.4 || data-sort-value="0.47" | 470 m || multiple || 2000–2004 || 23 Sep 2004 || 53 || align=left | Disc.: LONEOS || 
|- id="2000 SS43" bgcolor=#FFC2E0
| 7 ||  || AMO || 24.8 || data-sort-value="0.039" | 39 m || single || 66 days || 01 Dec 2000 || 26 || align=left | Disc.: LINEAR || 
|- id="2000 SO44" bgcolor=#FA8072
| 2 ||  || MCA || 17.7 || data-sort-value="0.86" | 860 m || multiple || 2000–2018 || 18 Mar 2018 || 35 || align=left | Disc.: LINEAR || 
|- id="2000 SZ44" bgcolor=#FFC2E0
| 1 ||  || AMO || 20.2 || data-sort-value="0.32" | 320 m || multiple || 2000–2019 || 19 Sep 2019 || 59 || align=left | Disc.: AMOS || 
|- id="2000 SB45" bgcolor=#FFC2E0
| 8 ||  || APO || 24.5 || data-sort-value="0.045" | 45 m || single || 3 days || 29 Sep 2000 || 18 || align=left | Disc.: LINEAR || 
|- id="2000 SS49" bgcolor=#fefefe
| 0 ||  || MBA-I || 18.1 || data-sort-value="0.71" | 710 m || multiple || 2000–2021 || 18 Jan 2021 || 79 || align=left | Disc.: LINEAR || 
|- id="2000 SY50" bgcolor=#d6d6d6
| 0 ||  || MBA-O || 16.5 || 2.8 km || multiple || 2000–2020 || 23 Mar 2020 || 59 || align=left | Disc.: LINEARAlt.: 2010 PK85 || 
|- id="2000 SS51" bgcolor=#E9E9E9
| 0 ||  || MBA-M || 17.42 || 1.4 km || multiple || 2000–2021 || 25 Oct 2021 || 214 || align=left | Disc.: LINEARAlt.: 2009 WL270, 2012 JO39 || 
|- id="2000 SW53" bgcolor=#fefefe
| 0 ||  || MBA-I || 18.0 || data-sort-value="0.75" | 750 m || multiple || 2000–2020 || 24 Jan 2020 || 144 || align=left | Disc.: LINEARAlt.: 2011 OQ28, 2015 TX188 || 
|- id="2000 SU55" bgcolor=#E9E9E9
| 0 ||  || MBA-M || 17.59 || 1.3 km || multiple || 2000–2021 || 31 Oct 2021 || 185 || align=left | Disc.: LINEAR || 
|- id="2000 SH57" bgcolor=#fefefe
| 0 ||  || MBA-I || 17.7 || data-sort-value="0.86" | 860 m || multiple || 2000–2020 || 16 Mar 2020 || 129 || align=left | Disc.: LINEARAlt.: 2014 OC8 || 
|- id="2000 SZ57" bgcolor=#fefefe
| 1 ||  || MBA-I || 18.4 || data-sort-value="0.62" | 620 m || multiple || 2000–2018 || 17 Nov 2018 || 110 || align=left | Disc.: LINEARAlt.: 2018 UK4 || 
|- id="2000 SE77" bgcolor=#E9E9E9
| 9 ||  || MBA-M || 17.38 || 1.9 km || single || 2 days || 26 Sep 2000 || 13 || align=left | Disc.: LINEARAdded on 21 August 2021 || 
|- id="2000 ST78" bgcolor=#fefefe
| 0 ||  || MBA-I || 18.19 || data-sort-value="0.68" | 680 m || multiple || 2000–2021 || 11 Apr 2021 || 93 || align=left | Disc.: LINEARAlt.: 2011 QC27 || 
|- id="2000 SE79" bgcolor=#fefefe
| 0 ||  || MBA-I || 17.82 || data-sort-value="0.81" | 810 m || multiple || 2000–2021 || 15 Apr 2021 || 85 || align=left | Disc.: LINEAR || 
|- id="2000 SO83" bgcolor=#FA8072
| 0 ||  || MCA || 18.54 || data-sort-value="0.58" | 580 m || multiple || 2000–2021 || 09 Dec 2021 || 179 || align=left | Disc.: LINEARAlt.: 2007 UB1 || 
|- id="2000 SG96" bgcolor=#E9E9E9
| 0 ||  || MBA-M || 17.76 || 1.2 km || multiple || 2000–2021 || 11 Jul 2021 || 65 || align=left | Disc.: LINEARAdded on 17 June 2021Alt.: 2013 SP104 || 
|- id="2000 SN106" bgcolor=#fefefe
| 0 ||  || MBA-I || 18.17 || data-sort-value="0.69" | 690 m || multiple || 2000–2021 || 30 May 2021 || 101 || align=left | Disc.: LINEAR || 
|- id="2000 SN131" bgcolor=#d6d6d6
| 0 ||  || MBA-O || 16.54 || 3.0 km || multiple || 2000–2022 || 20 Oct 2022 || 210 || align=left | Disc.: LINEAR || 
|- id="2000 SX131" bgcolor=#E9E9E9
| 1 ||  || MBA-M || 17.4 || 1.4 km || multiple || 2000–2019 || 14 Jan 2019 || 50 || align=left | Disc.: LINEARAlt.: 2017 ON33 || 
|- id="2000 SL134" bgcolor=#FA8072
| – ||  || MCA || 17.9 || 1.5 km || single || 13 days || 03 Oct 2000 || 19 || align=left | Disc.: LINEAR || 
|- id="2000 ST134" bgcolor=#E9E9E9
| 0 ||  || MBA-M || 17.19 || 1.1 km || multiple || 2000–2022 || 07 Jan 2022 || 57 || align=left | Disc.: LINEARAlt.: 2004 RE138 || 
|- id="2000 SK135" bgcolor=#fefefe
| 0 ||  || MBA-I || 18.0 || data-sort-value="0.75" | 750 m || multiple || 2000–2018 || 13 Jan 2018 || 86 || align=left | Disc.: LINEARAlt.: 2010 RU164, 2010 VX34 || 
|- id="2000 SE156" bgcolor=#E9E9E9
| 0 ||  || MBA-M || 17.63 || 1.3 km || multiple || 2000–2021 || 05 Nov 2021 || 243 || align=left | Disc.: LINEARAlt.: 2017 VZ5 || 
|- id="2000 SP159" bgcolor=#d6d6d6
| 0 ||  || MBA-O || 16.80 || 2.4 km || multiple || 2000–2021 || 07 Jul 2021 || 81 || align=left | Disc.: SpacewatchAdded on 22 July 2020 || 
|- id="2000 SZ162" bgcolor=#FFC2E0
| 8 ||  || ATE || 27.3 || data-sort-value="0.012" | 12 m || single || 8 days || 07 Oct 2000 || 30 || align=left | Disc.: Spacewatch || 
|- id="2000 SQ163" bgcolor=#E9E9E9
| 0 ||  || MBA-M || 17.46 || data-sort-value="0.96" | 960 m || multiple || 2000–2022 || 22 Jan 2022 || 52 || align=left | Disc.: LINEAR || 
|- id="2000 SU163" bgcolor=#E9E9E9
| 2 ||  || MBA-M || 17.8 || 1.2 km || multiple || 2000–2017 || 23 Nov 2017 || 61 || align=left | Disc.: LINEARAlt.: 2017 OF49 || 
|- id="2000 SW163" bgcolor=#E9E9E9
| 2 ||  || MBA-M || 17.6 || 1.7 km || multiple || 2000–2020 || 17 Feb 2020 || 61 || align=left | Disc.: LINEARAlt.: 2009 UX85 || 
|- id="2000 SV180" bgcolor=#FA8072
| 1 ||  || MCA || 18.8 || data-sort-value="0.52" | 520 m || multiple || 2000–2018 || 13 Jan 2018 || 152 || align=left | Disc.: LINEAR || 
|- id="2000 SP183" bgcolor=#d6d6d6
| 2 ||  || MBA-O || 16.8 || 2.2 km || multiple || 2000–2021 || 06 Jan 2021 || 134 || align=left | Disc.: AMOSAlt.: 2005 SN56 || 
|- id="2000 SC190" bgcolor=#E9E9E9
| 0 ||  || MBA-M || 17.11 || 1.6 km || multiple || 2000–2021 || 03 Dec 2021 || 286 || align=left | Disc.: Spacewatch || 
|- id="2000 SZ193" bgcolor=#fefefe
| 0 ||  || MBA-I || 17.42 || data-sort-value="0.98" | 980 m || multiple || 2000–2021 || 11 Jul 2021 || 151 || align=left | Disc.: LINEARAlt.: 2014 QJ156 || 
|- id="2000 SP194" bgcolor=#fefefe
| 0 ||  || MBA-I || 18.71 || data-sort-value="0.54" | 540 m || multiple || 2000–2021 || 09 May 2021 || 99 || align=left | Disc.: LINEARAlt.: 2011 UX391, 2018 RL20 || 
|- id="2000 SV195" bgcolor=#fefefe
| 0 ||  || MBA-I || 18.99 || data-sort-value="0.49" | 490 m || multiple || 2000-2022 || 29 Nov 2022 || 63 || align=left | Disc.: LINEAR Alt.: 2022 US9 || 
|- id="2000 SQ196" bgcolor=#fefefe
| 1 ||  || MBA-I || 18.3 || data-sort-value="0.65" | 650 m || multiple || 2000–2020 || 20 Oct 2020 || 71 || align=left | Disc.: LINEARAlt.: 2015 BP351 || 
|- id="2000 SS196" bgcolor=#E9E9E9
| 0 ||  || MBA-M || 16.57 || 2.7 km || multiple || 2000–2021 || 03 May 2021 || 139 || align=left | Disc.: LINEARAlt.: 2009 QU42 || 
|- id="2000 SG197" bgcolor=#fefefe
| 1 ||  || MBA-I || 18.1 || data-sort-value="0.71" | 710 m || multiple || 2000–2019 || 29 Oct 2019 || 125 || align=left | Disc.: LINEAR || 
|- id="2000 SP198" bgcolor=#fefefe
| 1 ||  || MBA-I || 18.1 || data-sort-value="0.71" | 710 m || multiple || 2000–2018 || 07 Mar 2018 || 50 || align=left | Disc.: LINEARAlt.: 2009 HB48 || 
|- id="2000 SX200" bgcolor=#fefefe
| 1 ||  || MBA-I || 18.6 || data-sort-value="0.57" | 570 m || multiple || 2000–2020 || 17 Sep 2020 || 48 || align=left | Disc.: LINEARAdded on 17 January 2021 || 
|- id="2000 SL201" bgcolor=#E9E9E9
| 3 ||  || MBA-M || 19.7 || data-sort-value="0.34" | 340 m || multiple || 2000–2021 || 28 Nov 2021 || 41 || align=left | Disc.: LINEARAdded on 29 January 2022 || 
|- id="2000 SV202" bgcolor=#fefefe
| 0 ||  || MBA-I || 17.7 || data-sort-value="0.86" | 860 m || multiple || 2000–2019 || 30 Nov 2019 || 138 || align=left | Disc.: LINEARAlt.: 2015 TY166 || 
|- id="2000 SE205" bgcolor=#E9E9E9
| 0 ||  || MBA-M || 18.23 || data-sort-value="0.95" | 950 m || multiple || 2000–2021 || 31 Oct 2021 || 187 || align=left | Disc.: LINEARAlt.: 2017 UJ12 || 
|- id="2000 SX206" bgcolor=#E9E9E9
| 0 ||  || MBA-M || 17.61 || data-sort-value="0.89" | 890 m || multiple || 2000–2021 || 28 Nov 2021 || 137 || align=left | Disc.: LINEARAlt.: 2004 RB54 || 
|- id="2000 ST214" bgcolor=#d6d6d6
| 1 ||  || MBA-O || 18.22|| 1.1 km || multiple || 2000-2022 || 14 Oct 2022 || 59 || align=left | Disc.: LINEAR || 
|- id="2000 SH215" bgcolor=#FA8072
| 2 ||  || MCA || 19.3 || data-sort-value="0.41" | 410 m || multiple || 2000–2020 || 06 Dec 2020 || 100 || align=left | Disc.: LINEARAlt.: 2010 RV145 || 
|- id="2000 SJ229" bgcolor=#E9E9E9
| 0 ||  || MBA-M || 17.6 || 1.3 km || multiple || 2000–2019 || 05 Feb 2019 || 88 || align=left | Disc.: LINEARAlt.: 2013 TA3 || 
|- id="2000 SZ231" bgcolor=#E9E9E9
| 1 ||  || MBA-M || 17.0 || 2.2 km || multiple || 2000–2020 || 28 Jan 2020 || 81 || align=left | Disc.: LINEARAlt.: 2014 QY406 || 
|- id="2000 SG232" bgcolor=#FA8072
| – ||  || MCA || 17.1 || 1.1 km || single || 7 days || 04 Oct 2000 || 15 || align=left | Disc.: LINEAR || 
|- id="2000 SR239" bgcolor=#fefefe
| 0 ||  || MBA-I || 17.7 || data-sort-value="0.86" | 860 m || multiple || 2000–2018 || 04 Jul 2018 || 85 || align=left | Disc.: LINEAR || 
|- id="2000 SH240" bgcolor=#FA8072
| 0 ||  || MCA || 17.59 || data-sort-value="0.90" | 900 m || multiple || 2000–2021 || 16 Apr 2021 || 98 || align=left | Disc.: LINEARAlt.: 2007 LY14, 2011 RB || 
|- id="2000 SC241" bgcolor=#FFC2E0
| 5 ||  || AMO || 20.2 || data-sort-value="0.32" | 320 m || single || 83 days || 22 Dec 2000 || 19 || align=left | Disc.: LINEAR || 
|- id="2000 SZ243" bgcolor=#E9E9E9
| 0 ||  || MBA-M || 17.15 || 1.6 km || multiple || 2000–2019 || 15 Jan 2019 || 120 || align=left | Disc.: LINEARAlt.: 2013 PY37 || 
|- id="2000 SD245" bgcolor=#fefefe
| 0 ||  || MBA-I || 17.68 || data-sort-value="0.87" | 870 m || multiple || 2000–2021 || 05 Apr 2021 || 228 || align=left | Disc.: LINEAR || 
|- id="2000 SS246" bgcolor=#E9E9E9
| 0 ||  || MBA-M || 17.73 || data-sort-value="0.85" | 850 m || multiple || 1996–2022 || 27 Jan 2022 || 62 || align=left | Disc.: LINEAR || 
|- id="2000 SG247" bgcolor=#E9E9E9
| 0 ||  || MBA-M || 17.90 || data-sort-value="0.78" | 780 m || multiple || 2000–2022 || 06 Jan 2022 || 94 || align=left | Disc.: LINEAR || 
|- id="2000 SB254" bgcolor=#d6d6d6
| 0 ||  || MBA-O || 16.2 || 3.2 km || multiple || 2000–2021 || 13 Dec 2021 || 106 || align=left | Disc.: LINEARAlt.: 2010 KY70 || 
|- id="2000 SN264" bgcolor=#E9E9E9
| 0 ||  || MBA-M || 17.36 || 1.4 km || multiple || 2000–2021 || 13 May 2021 || 67 || align=left | Disc.: LINEAR || 
|- id="2000 SY267" bgcolor=#E9E9E9
| 0 ||  || MBA-M || 18.05 || data-sort-value="0.73" | 730 m || multiple || 2000–2022 || 27 Jan 2022 || 66 || align=left | Disc.: LINEAR || 
|- id="2000 SA268" bgcolor=#fefefe
| 1 ||  || MBA-I || 18.7 || data-sort-value="0.54" | 540 m || multiple || 2000–2019 || 02 Jan 2019 || 44 || align=left | Disc.: LINEAR || 
|- id="2000 SR272" bgcolor=#E9E9E9
| 1 ||  || MBA-M || 17.5 || 1.8 km || multiple || 2000–2020 || 12 Apr 2020 || 188 || align=left | Disc.: LINEAR || 
|- id="2000 SH273" bgcolor=#d6d6d6
| 0 ||  || MBA-O || 17.0 || 2.2 km || multiple || 2000–2018 || 12 Jan 2018 || 78 || align=left | Disc.: LINEAR || 
|- id="2000 SY283" bgcolor=#E9E9E9
| 0 ||  || MBA-M || 16.9 || 2.3 km || multiple || 2000–2019 || 28 Dec 2019 || 125 || align=left | Disc.: LINEARAlt.: 2005 VK22 || 
|- id="2000 SX285" bgcolor=#fefefe
| 0 ||  || MBA-I || 17.0 || 1.2 km || multiple || 2000–2021 || 06 Jan 2021 || 115 || align=left | Disc.: LINEAR || 
|- id="2000 SM290" bgcolor=#fefefe
| 0 ||  || MBA-I || 17.4 || data-sort-value="0.98" | 980 m || multiple || 2000–2020 || 14 Feb 2020 || 113 || align=left | Disc.: LINEARAlt.: 2011 UO295, 2013 EG6 || 
|- id="2000 SM296" bgcolor=#E9E9E9
| 0 ||  || MBA-M || 16.9 || 1.2 km || multiple || 2000–2022 || 01 Jan 2022 || 71 || align=left | Disc.: LINEARAdded on 21 August 2021 || 
|- id="2000 SO296" bgcolor=#E9E9E9
| 2 ||  || MBA-M || 16.8 || 1.3 km || multiple || 2000–2020 || 16 Jul 2020 || 76 || align=left | Disc.: LINEAR || 
|- id="2000 SZ299" bgcolor=#FA8072
| 0 ||  || MCA || 18.86 || data-sort-value="0.50" | 500 m || multiple || 2000–2021 || 09 Dec 2021 || 77 || align=left | Disc.: LINEARAlt.: 2007 TA78, 2015 AE208 || 
|- id="2000 SO303" bgcolor=#FA8072
| 0 ||  || MCA || 18.11 || data-sort-value="0.71" | 710 m || multiple || 2000–2021 || 21 Nov 2021 || 270 || align=left | Disc.: LINEARAlt.: 2007 TY81 || 
|- id="2000 SX308" bgcolor=#FA8072
| 0 ||  || MCA || 18.61 || data-sort-value="0.80" | 800 m || multiple || 2000–2021 || 20 Nov 2021 || 225 || align=left | Disc.: LINEARAlt.: 2021 OM1 || 
|- id="2000 SZ308" bgcolor=#fefefe
| 0 ||  || MBA-I || 17.93 || data-sort-value="0.77" | 770 m || multiple || 2000–2022 || 06 Jan 2022 || 263 || align=left | Disc.: LINEARAlt.: 2007 TT14 || 
|- id="2000 SU314" bgcolor=#C7FF8F
| 0 ||  || CEN || 15.41 || 4.0 km || multiple || 2000-2022 || 25 Nov 2022 || 114 || align=left | Disc.: LINEARAlt.: 2022 KV25 Added on 21 August 2021 || 
|- id="2000 SR316" bgcolor=#d6d6d6
| 0 ||  || MBA-O || 16.94 || 2.3 km || multiple || 2000–2021 || 27 Sep 2021 || 117 || align=left | Disc.: LINEAR || 
|- id="2000 SA317" bgcolor=#d6d6d6
| 0 ||  || MBA-O || 16.86 || 2.4 km || multiple || 2000–2021 || 30 Dec 2021 || 77 || align=left | Disc.: LINEARAlt.: 2010 KR14 || 
|- id="2000 SZ317" bgcolor=#E9E9E9
| 0 ||  || MBA-M || 16.62 || 2.0 km || multiple || 1987–2021 || 28 Jul 2021 || 238 || align=left | Disc.: La Silla Obs.Alt.: 1987 QS6 || 
|- id="2000 SC320" bgcolor=#d6d6d6
| 0 ||  || MBA-O || 15.6 || 4.2 km || multiple || 2000–2020 || 23 May 2020 || 143 || align=left | Disc.: SpacewatchAlt.: 2011 QV66, 2015 FE333 || 
|- id="2000 SQ321" bgcolor=#d6d6d6
| 0 ||  || MBA-O || 16.45 || 2.9 km || multiple || 2000–2021 || 18 May 2021 || 113 || align=left | Disc.: SpacewatchAlt.: 2011 PK11 || 
|- id="2000 SY321" bgcolor=#E9E9E9
| 0 ||  || MBA-M || 18.22 || data-sort-value="0.67" | 670 m || multiple || 1996–2022 || 27 Jan 2022 || 95 || align=left | Disc.: SpacewatchAlt.: 2016 PK18 || 
|- id="2000 SV323" bgcolor=#E9E9E9
| 0 ||  || MBA-M || 17.78 || data-sort-value="0.83" | 830 m || multiple || 2000–2022 || 25 Jan 2022 || 122 || align=left | Disc.: Spacewatch || 
|- id="2000 SN324" bgcolor=#fefefe
| 0 ||  || MBA-I || 17.9 || data-sort-value="0.78" | 780 m || multiple || 2000–2020 || 11 Dec 2020 || 140 || align=left | Disc.: SpacewatchAlt.: 2007 WJ28, 2010 VL13 || 
|- id="2000 SX324" bgcolor=#fefefe
| 1 ||  || MBA-I || 18.6 || data-sort-value="0.57" | 570 m || multiple || 2000–2018 || 02 Nov 2018 || 65 || align=left | Disc.: SpacewatchAlt.: 2011 WK82 || 
|- id="2000 SQ325" bgcolor=#E9E9E9
| 0 ||  || MBA-M || 17.4 || 1.8 km || multiple || 2000–2020 || 24 Jan 2020 || 109 || align=left | Disc.: Spacewatch || 
|- id="2000 SZ328" bgcolor=#E9E9E9
| 0 ||  || MBA-M || 16.76 || 2.5 km || multiple || 2000–2021 || 11 Jul 2021 || 191 || align=left | Disc.: LINEARAlt.: 2007 GK44, 2014 YU48, 2018 RU36 || 
|- id="2000 SA330" bgcolor=#fefefe
| 0 ||  || MBA-I || 18.6 || data-sort-value="0.57" | 570 m || multiple || 2000–2019 || 24 Oct 2019 || 69 || align=left | Disc.: Spacewatch || 
|- id="2000 SN330" bgcolor=#fefefe
| 0 ||  || MBA-I || 18.5 || data-sort-value="0.59" | 590 m || multiple || 2000–2018 || 13 Aug 2018 || 40 || align=left | Disc.: SpacewatchAlt.: 2018 PA26 || 
|- id="2000 SB331" bgcolor=#C2E0FF
| E ||  || TNO || 7.7 || 99 km || single || 1 day || 24 Sep 2000 || 6 || align=left | Disc.: Mauna Kea Obs.LoUTNOs, cubewano? || 
|- id="2000 SC331" bgcolor=#C2E0FF
| E ||  || TNO || 7.9 || 90 km || single || 1 day || 24 Sep 2000 || 6 || align=left | Disc.: Mauna Kea Obs.LoUTNOs, cubewano? || 
|- id="2000 SD331" bgcolor=#C2E0FF
| E ||  || TNO || 7.5 || 109 km || single || 1 day || 24 Sep 2000 || 6 || align=left | Disc.: Mauna Kea Obs.LoUTNOs, cubewano? || 
|- id="2000 SE331" bgcolor=#C2E0FF
| E ||  || TNO || 7.9 || 90 km || single || 1 day || 24 Sep 2000 || 6 || align=left | Disc.: Mauna Kea Obs.LoUTNOs, cubewano? || 
|- id="2000 SF331" bgcolor=#C2E0FF
| E ||  || TNO || 7.4 || 114 km || single || 65 days || 27 Nov 2000 || 9 || align=left | Disc.: Mauna Kea Obs.LoUTNOs, cubewano? || 
|- id="2000 SG331" bgcolor=#C2E0FF
| E ||  || TNO || 7.8 || 95 km || single || 1 day || 24 Sep 2000 || 6 || align=left | Disc.: Mauna Kea Obs.LoUTNOs, cubewano? || 
|- id="2000 SH331" bgcolor=#C2E0FF
| E ||  || TNO || 7.7 || 99 km || single || 1 day || 24 Sep 2000 || 6 || align=left | Disc.: Mauna Kea Obs.LoUTNOs, cubewano? || 
|- id="2000 SJ331" bgcolor=#C2E0FF
| E ||  || TNO || 8.3 || 75 km || single || 1 day || 24 Sep 2000 || 5 || align=left | Disc.: Mauna Kea Obs.LoUTNOs, cubewano? || 
|- id="2000 SK331" bgcolor=#C2E0FF
| E ||  || TNO || 7.9 || 90 km || multiple || 2000–2001 || 15 Nov 2001 || 10 || align=left | Disc.: Mauna Kea Obs.LoUTNOs, cubewano? || 
|- id="2000 SL331" bgcolor=#C2E0FF
| E ||  || TNO || 8.2 || 79 km || single || 1 day || 24 Sep 2000 || 5 || align=left | Disc.: Mauna Kea Obs.LoUTNOs, cubewano? || 
|- id="2000 SM331" bgcolor=#C2E0FF
| E ||  || TNO || 9.0 || 60 km || single || 1 day || 24 Sep 2000 || 6 || align=left | Disc.: Mauna Kea Obs.LoUTNOs, SDO || 
|- id="2000 SO331" bgcolor=#C2E0FF
| E ||  || TNO || 8.3 || 75 km || single || 1 day || 24 Sep 2000 || 6 || align=left | Disc.: Mauna Kea Obs.LoUTNOs, cubewano? || 
|- id="2000 SP331" bgcolor=#C2E0FF
| E ||  || TNO || 8.1 || 82 km || single || 1 day || 24 Sep 2000 || 6 || align=left | Disc.: Mauna Kea Obs.LoUTNOs, cubewano? || 
|- id="2000 SQ331" bgcolor=#C2E0FF
| E ||  || TNO || 10.7 || 40 km || single || 1 day || 24 Sep 2000 || 6 || align=left | Disc.: Mauna Kea Obs.LoUTNOs, centaur || 
|- id="2000 SR331" bgcolor=#C2E0FF
| 3 ||  || TNO || 8.74 || 65 km || multiple || 2000–2021 || 01 Dec 2021 || 26 || align=left | Disc.: Mauna Kea Obs.LoUTNOs, res2:5 || 
|- id="2000 SS331" bgcolor=#C2E0FF
| E ||  || TNO || 9.5 || 48 km || single || 1 day || 24 Sep 2000 || 6 || align=left | Disc.: Mauna Kea Obs.LoUTNOs, SDO || 
|- id="2000 ST331" bgcolor=#C2E0FF
| E ||  || TNO || 8.7 || 62 km || multiple || 2000–2001 || 15 Nov 2001 || 10 || align=left | Disc.: Mauna Kea Obs.LoUTNOs, cubewano? || 
|- id="2000 SU331" bgcolor=#C2E0FF
| E ||  || TNO || 9.5 || 48 km || single || 1 day || 24 Sep 2000 || 6 || align=left | Disc.: Mauna Kea Obs.LoUTNOs, SDO || 
|- id="2000 SY331" bgcolor=#d6d6d6
| 3 ||  || MBA-O || 18.1 || 1.3 km || multiple || 2000–2021 || 18 Jul 2021 || 19 || align=left | Disc.: Mauna Kea Obs.Added on 21 August 2021 || 
|- id="2000 SB332" bgcolor=#d6d6d6
| 0 ||  || MBA-O || 16.33 || 3.0 km || multiple || 1994–2021 || 08 Jul 2021 || 134 || align=left | Disc.: Mauna Kea Obs. || 
|- id="2000 SE332" bgcolor=#d6d6d6
| 0 ||  || MBA-O || 16.82 || 2.4 km || multiple || 2000–2021 || 01 Nov 2021 || 122 || align=left | Disc.: Mauna Kea Obs.Alt.: 2015 PN140, 2016 VZ12 || 
|- id="2000 SP332" bgcolor=#d6d6d6
| 0 ||  || MBA-O || 17.27 || 2.0 km || multiple || 2000–2021 || 06 Oct 2021 || 62 || align=left | Disc.: Mauna Kea Obs.Added on 19 October 2020 || 
|- id="2000 SB333" bgcolor=#fefefe
| 0 ||  || MBA-I || 17.9 || data-sort-value="0.78" | 780 m || multiple || 2000–2020 || 15 Oct 2020 || 143 || align=left | Disc.: LINEAR || 
|- id="2000 SR334" bgcolor=#fefefe
| 0 ||  || MBA-I || 17.69 || data-sort-value="0.86" | 860 m || multiple || 2000–2021 || 27 Nov 2021 || 181 || align=left | Disc.: AMOSAlt.: 2010 NR60, 2014 OG294 || 
|- id="2000 SZ338" bgcolor=#fefefe
| 1 ||  || MBA-I || 18.7 || data-sort-value="0.54" | 540 m || multiple || 2000–2019 || 05 Jul 2019 || 29 || align=left | Disc.: SpacewatchAlt.: 2008 UN357 || 
|- id="2000 SH340" bgcolor=#fefefe
| 0 ||  || HUN || 18.04 || data-sort-value="0.73" | 730 m || multiple || 2000–2021 || 14 Aug 2021 || 135 || align=left | Disc.: LINEAR || 
|- id="2000 SM342" bgcolor=#fefefe
| 0 ||  || MBA-I || 18.4 || data-sort-value="0.62" | 620 m || multiple || 2000–2020 || 25 Nov 2020 || 58 || align=left | Disc.: LINEAR || 
|- id="2000 SU342" bgcolor=#fefefe
| 0 ||  || MBA-I || 18.8 || data-sort-value="0.52" | 520 m || multiple || 2000–2015 || 13 Dec 2015 || 29 || align=left | Disc.: Spacewatch || 
|- id="2000 SG344" bgcolor=#FFC2E0
| 4 ||  || ATE || 24.7 || data-sort-value="0.041" | 41 m || multiple || 1999–2000 || 03 Oct 2000 || 31 || align=left | Disc.: Mauna Kea Obs. || 
|- id="2000 SL345" bgcolor=#fefefe
| 1 ||  || MBA-I || 18.8 || data-sort-value="0.52" | 520 m || multiple || 2000–2019 || 31 Oct 2019 || 31 || align=left | Disc.: Kitt Peak || 
|- id="2000 SS345" bgcolor=#E9E9E9
| 0 ||  || MBA-M || 18.68 || data-sort-value="0.55" | 550 m || multiple || 2000–2021 || 26 Nov 2021 || 34 || align=left | Disc.: Kitt PeakAdded on 17 June 2021 || 
|- id="2000 SD346" bgcolor=#fefefe
| 0 ||  || MBA-I || 18.2 || data-sort-value="0.68" | 680 m || multiple || 2000–2018 || 09 Nov 2018 || 50 || align=left | Disc.: Kitt PeakAlt.: 2014 QC271 || 
|- id="2000 SO350" bgcolor=#fefefe
| 0 ||  || MBA-I || 16.5 || 1.5 km || multiple || 2000–2021 || 16 Jan 2021 || 171 || align=left | Disc.: LONEOS || 
|- id="2000 SP355" bgcolor=#E9E9E9
| 0 ||  || MBA-M || 17.2 || 1.5 km || multiple || 2000–2021 || 07 Jun 2021 || 82 || align=left | Disc.: LONEOSAlt.: 2008 KJ32, 2015 AW106 || 
|- id="2000 SC359" bgcolor=#d6d6d6
| 0 ||  || MBA-O || 16.1 || 3.4 km || multiple || 2000–2019 || 28 Feb 2019 || 61 || align=left | Disc.: LONEOSAdded on 21 August 2021Alt.: 2011 PC15 || 
|- id="2000 SZ359" bgcolor=#fefefe
| 0 ||  || MBA-I || 17.66 || data-sort-value="0.87" | 870 m || multiple || 2000–2021 || 03 May 2021 || 164 || align=left | Disc.: LONEOSAlt.: 2014 KD47, 2015 TH250 || 
|- id="2000 SL361" bgcolor=#FA8072
| 0 ||  || MCA || 18.6 || data-sort-value="0.57" | 570 m || multiple || 2000–2016 || 08 Sep 2016 || 43 || align=left | Disc.: LONEOS || 
|- id="2000 SC365" bgcolor=#fefefe
| 0 ||  || MBA-I || 18.06 || data-sort-value="0.73" | 730 m || multiple || 2000–2021 || 08 May 2021 || 81 || align=left | Disc.: LONEOSAlt.: 2018 NT6 || 
|- id="2000 SP366" bgcolor=#E9E9E9
| – ||  || MBA-M || 17.8 || data-sort-value="0.82" | 820 m || single || 8 days || 01 Oct 2000 || 12 || align=left | Disc.: LONEOS || 
|- id="2000 SV366" bgcolor=#E9E9E9
| 2 ||  || MBA-M || 17.6 || data-sort-value="0.90" | 900 m || multiple || 2000–2020 || 23 Jul 2020 || 81 || align=left | Disc.: LONEOSAlt.: 2004 PR28 || 
|- id="2000 SO370" bgcolor=#fefefe
| 0 ||  || MBA-I || 17.9 || data-sort-value="0.78" | 780 m || multiple || 2000–2019 || 17 Dec 2019 || 45 || align=left | Disc.: LONEOS || 
|- id="2000 SW370" bgcolor=#C2E0FF
| E ||  || TNO || 8.5 || 68 km || single || 1 day || 24 Sep 2000 || 6 || align=left | Disc.: Mauna Kea Obs.LoUTNOs, cubewano? || 
|- id="2000 SX370" bgcolor=#C2E0FF
| E ||  || TNO || 8.2 || 95 km || single || 1 day || 24 Sep 2000 || 6 || align=left | Disc.: Mauna Kea Obs.LoUTNOs, other TNO || 
|- id="2000 SY370" bgcolor=#C2E0FF
| 3 ||  || TNO || 8.0 || 83 km || multiple || 1999–2019 || 04 Sep 2019 || 18 || align=left | Disc.: Mauna Kea Obs.LoUTNOs, cubewano (cold) || 
|- id="2000 SV372" bgcolor=#C2FFFF
| 0 ||  || JT || 14.23 || 7.9 km || multiple || 2000–2021 || 26 Aug 2021 || 69 || align=left | Disc.: SDSSTrojan camp (L5)Alt.: 2015 AC46 || 
|- id="2000 SW372" bgcolor=#d6d6d6
| 0 ||  || MBA-O || 16.95 || 2.3 km || multiple || 2000–2022 || 27 Jan 2022 || 155 || align=left | Disc.: SDSS || 
|- id="2000 SX372" bgcolor=#d6d6d6
| 0 ||  || MBA-O || 17.38 || 1.9 km || multiple || 2000–2021 || 28 Jul 2021 || 30 || align=left | Disc.: SDSSAdded on 22 July 2020 || 
|- id="2000 SY372" bgcolor=#fefefe
| 0 ||  || MBA-I || 18.3 || data-sort-value="0.65" | 650 m || multiple || 2000–2020 || 24 Dec 2020 || 27 || align=left | Disc.: SDSSAdded on 22 July 2020 || 
|- id="2000 SA373" bgcolor=#E9E9E9
| 0 ||  || MBA-M || 17.54 || data-sort-value="0.92" | 920 m || multiple || 2000–2021 || 04 Dec 2021 || 138 || align=left | Disc.: SDSS || 
|- id="2000 SH373" bgcolor=#d6d6d6
| 0 ||  || MBA-O || 16.8 || 2.4 km || multiple || 2000–2021 || 13 Jun 2021 || 88 || align=left | Disc.: SDSS || 
|- id="2000 SK373" bgcolor=#d6d6d6
| 0 ||  || MBA-O || 16.7 || 2.5 km || multiple || 1995–2020 || 29 Apr 2020 || 65 || align=left | Disc.: SDSSAlt.: 2016 PF43 || 
|- id="2000 SM373" bgcolor=#fefefe
| 0 ||  || MBA-I || 18.7 || data-sort-value="0.54" | 540 m || multiple || 2000–2019 || 04 Nov 2019 || 34 || align=left | Disc.: SDSSAdded on 22 July 2020 || 
|- id="2000 SN373" bgcolor=#E9E9E9
| 0 ||  || MBA-M || 17.72 || 1.2 km || multiple || 2000–2021 || 01 Jul 2021 || 67 || align=left | Disc.: SDSSAlt.: 2010 AR148 || 
|- id="2000 SR373" bgcolor=#fefefe
| 0 ||  || MBA-I || 18.89 || data-sort-value="0.50" | 500 m || multiple || 2000–2021 || 11 Jul 2021 || 46 || align=left | Disc.: SDSS || 
|- id="2000 SS373" bgcolor=#d6d6d6
| 0 ||  || MBA-O || 16.9 || 2.3 km || multiple || 2000–2021 || 11 Jun 2021 || 50 || align=left | Disc.: SDSSAlt.: 2012 XU99 || 
|- id="2000 ST373" bgcolor=#d6d6d6
| 0 ||  || MBA-O || 16.3 || 3.1 km || multiple || 2000–2020 || 21 May 2020 || 93 || align=left | Disc.: SDSS || 
|- id="2000 SW373" bgcolor=#fefefe
| 1 ||  || MBA-I || 19.20 || data-sort-value="0.43" | 430 m || multiple || 2000–2021 || 28 Nov 2021 || 70 || align=left | Disc.: SDSSAlt.: 2014 QG332 || 
|- id="2000 SY373" bgcolor=#fefefe
| 1 ||  || MBA-I || 19.4 || data-sort-value="0.39" | 390 m || multiple || 2000–2019 || 24 Aug 2019 || 40 || align=left | Disc.: SDSS || 
|- id="2000 SG374" bgcolor=#d6d6d6
| 0 ||  || MBA-O || 16.96 || 2.3 km || multiple || 2000–2021 || 13 Jul 2021 || 77 || align=left | Disc.: SDSSAlt.: 2015 KV103 || 
|- id="2000 SP374" bgcolor=#E9E9E9
| 0 ||  || MBA-M || 17.3 || 1.9 km || multiple || 2000–2021 || 12 Jun 2021 || 62 || align=left | Disc.: SDSS || 
|- id="2000 SX374" bgcolor=#d6d6d6
| 0 ||  || MBA-O || 16.7 || 2.5 km || multiple || 2000–2020 || 21 May 2020 || 80 || align=left | Disc.: SDSSAlt.: 2015 KL98 || 
|- id="2000 SH375" bgcolor=#d6d6d6
| 0 ||  || MBA-O || 16.76 || 2.5 km || multiple || 2000–2021 || 30 Nov 2021 || 115 || align=left | Disc.: SDSSAlt.: 2019 JE24 || 
|- id="2000 SB376" bgcolor=#E9E9E9
| 0 ||  || MBA-M || 17.41 || data-sort-value="0.98" | 980 m || multiple || 2000–2021 || 06 Dec 2021 || 120 || align=left | Disc.: SDSS || 
|- id="2000 SO376" bgcolor=#fefefe
| 0 ||  || MBA-I || 18.87 || data-sort-value="0.50" | 500 m || multiple || 2000–2021 || 12 Jun 2021 || 47 || align=left | Disc.: SpacewatchAdded on 17 June 2021 || 
|- id="2000 SA377" bgcolor=#E9E9E9
| 0 ||  || MBA-M || 17.16 || 1.1 km || multiple || 2000–2022 || 06 Jan 2022 || 164 || align=left | Disc.: AMOS || 
|- id="2000 SC377" bgcolor=#d6d6d6
| 0 ||  || HIL || 16.07 || 3.4 km || multiple || 2000–2021 || 07 Apr 2021 || 72 || align=left | Disc.: Kitt Peak || 
|- id="2000 SD377" bgcolor=#d6d6d6
| 0 ||  || MBA-O || 16.19 || 3.2 km || multiple || 1995–2021 || 27 Oct 2021 || 151 || align=left | Disc.: AMOSAdded on 13 September 2020 || 
|- id="2000 SG377" bgcolor=#E9E9E9
| 0 ||  || MBA-M || 17.38 || 1.4 km || multiple || 2000–2021 || 29 Oct 2021 || 131 || align=left | Disc.: Spacewatch || 
|- id="2000 SH377" bgcolor=#d6d6d6
| 0 ||  || MBA-O || 16.57 || 2.7 km || multiple || 2000–2021 || 09 Dec 2021 || 170 || align=left | Disc.: SDSS || 
|- id="2000 SM377" bgcolor=#d6d6d6
| 0 ||  = (619213) || MBA-O || 16.6 || 2.7 km || multiple || 2000–2020 || 22 Jun 2020 || 96 || align=left | Disc.: Spacewatch || 
|- id="2000 SN377" bgcolor=#fefefe
| 0 ||  || MBA-I || 18.14 || data-sort-value="0.70" | 700 m || multiple || 2000–2021 || 14 Apr 2021 || 150 || align=left | Disc.: Spacewatch || 
|- id="2000 SP377" bgcolor=#E9E9E9
| 0 ||  || MBA-M || 17.12 || 1.1 km || multiple || 2000–2021 || 09 Dec 2021 || 159 || align=left | Disc.: SDSS || 
|- id="2000 SS377" bgcolor=#d6d6d6
| 0 ||  || MBA-O || 16.4 || 2.9 km || multiple || 2000–2020 || 25 Mar 2020 || 96 || align=left | Disc.: SDSS || 
|- id="2000 ST377" bgcolor=#fefefe
| 0 ||  || MBA-I || 17.8 || data-sort-value="0.82" | 820 m || multiple || 2000–2021 || 16 Jan 2021 || 105 || align=left | Disc.: Spacewatch || 
|- id="2000 SU377" bgcolor=#E9E9E9
| 0 ||  || MBA-M || 17.63 || 1.3 km || multiple || 2000–2021 || 25 Sep 2021 || 115 || align=left | Disc.: LONEOS || 
|- id="2000 SX377" bgcolor=#fefefe
| 0 ||  || MBA-I || 18.05 || data-sort-value="0.73" | 730 m || multiple || 2000–2021 || 02 May 2021 || 150 || align=left | Disc.: Spacewatch || 
|- id="2000 SY377" bgcolor=#d6d6d6
| 0 ||  || MBA-O || 16.07 || 3.4 km || multiple || 2000–2022 || 27 Jan 2022 || 170 || align=left | Disc.: SDSSAlt.: 2010 LX76 || 
|- id="2000 SA378" bgcolor=#fefefe
| 0 ||  || MBA-I || 18.25 || data-sort-value="0.67" | 670 m || multiple || 2000–2022 || 25 Jan 2022 || 106 || align=left | Disc.: Spacewatch || 
|- id="2000 SD378" bgcolor=#E9E9E9
| 0 ||  || MBA-M || 17.29 || 1.5 km || multiple || 2000–2021 || 27 Nov 2021 || 116 || align=left | Disc.: Spacewatch || 
|- id="2000 SE378" bgcolor=#E9E9E9
| 0 ||  || MBA-M || 16.5 || 2.1 km || multiple || 2000–2021 || 06 Jun 2021 || 105 || align=left | Disc.: SDSSAlt.: 2016 AG159 || 
|- id="2000 SG378" bgcolor=#d6d6d6
| 0 ||  || MBA-O || 16.47 || 2.8 km || multiple || 2000–2021 || 01 Jul 2021 || 120 || align=left | Disc.: Kitt Peak || 
|- id="2000 SJ378" bgcolor=#fefefe
| 0 ||  || MBA-I || 18.9 || data-sort-value="0.49" | 490 m || multiple || 2000–2018 || 16 Jan 2018 || 59 || align=left | Disc.: Spacewatch || 
|- id="2000 SM378" bgcolor=#d6d6d6
| 0 ||  || MBA-O || 16.82 || 2.4 km || multiple || 2000–2021 || 15 Sep 2021 || 76 || align=left | Disc.: SDSS || 
|- id="2000 SN378" bgcolor=#E9E9E9
| 0 ||  || MBA-M || 17.18 || 1.5 km || multiple || 2009–2021 || 23 Nov 2021 || 99 || align=left | Disc.: SDSS || 
|- id="2000 SP378" bgcolor=#E9E9E9
| 0 ||  || MBA-M || 16.8 || 1.8 km || multiple || 2000–2021 || 16 Jun 2021 || 94 || align=left | Disc.: SDSS || 
|- id="2000 SQ378" bgcolor=#d6d6d6
| 0 ||  || MBA-O || 16.7 || 2.5 km || multiple || 2000–2020 || 21 May 2020 || 57 || align=left | Disc.: SDSS || 
|- id="2000 SV378" bgcolor=#d6d6d6
| 0 ||  || MBA-O || 16.7 || 2.5 km || multiple || 2000–2020 || 29 Apr 2020 || 62 || align=left | Disc.: SDSS || 
|- id="2000 SX378" bgcolor=#E9E9E9
| 0 ||  || MBA-M || 17.3 || 1.5 km || multiple || 2000–2020 || 11 May 2020 || 69 || align=left | Disc.: SDSS || 
|- id="2000 SY378" bgcolor=#fefefe
| 0 ||  || MBA-I || 18.18 || data-sort-value="0.69" | 690 m || multiple || 2000–2021 || 14 May 2021 || 96 || align=left | Disc.: Spacewatch || 
|- id="2000 SB379" bgcolor=#fefefe
| 0 ||  || MBA-I || 17.9 || data-sort-value="0.78" | 780 m || multiple || 2000–2021 || 29 May 2021 || 87 || align=left | Disc.: Spacewatch || 
|- id="2000 SC379" bgcolor=#fefefe
| 0 ||  || MBA-I || 18.2 || data-sort-value="0.68" | 680 m || multiple || 2000–2021 || 18 Jan 2021 || 100 || align=left | Disc.: Spacewatch || 
|- id="2000 SE379" bgcolor=#d6d6d6
| 0 ||  || MBA-O || 16.2 || 3.2 km || multiple || 2000–2020 || 16 Apr 2020 || 77 || align=left | Disc.: Kitt Peak || 
|- id="2000 SG379" bgcolor=#d6d6d6
| 0 ||  || MBA-O || 16.63 || 2.6 km || multiple || 2000–2022 || 06 Jan 2022 || 151 || align=left | Disc.: SDSS || 
|- id="2000 SH379" bgcolor=#E9E9E9
| 0 ||  || MBA-M || 17.60 || 1.3 km || multiple || 2000–2021 || 07 Sep 2021 || 73 || align=left | Disc.: Spacewatch || 
|- id="2000 SK379" bgcolor=#fefefe
| 0 ||  || MBA-I || 18.3 || data-sort-value="0.65" | 650 m || multiple || 2000–2021 || 06 Jan 2021 || 70 || align=left | Disc.: Kitt Peak || 
|- id="2000 SL379" bgcolor=#E9E9E9
| 0 ||  || MBA-M || 17.5 || 1.8 km || multiple || 2000–2018 || 03 Oct 2018 || 57 || align=left | Disc.: SDSS || 
|- id="2000 SM379" bgcolor=#fefefe
| 0 ||  || MBA-I || 18.65 || data-sort-value="0.55" | 550 m || multiple || 2000–2021 || 08 May 2021 || 95 || align=left | Disc.: Spacewatch || 
|- id="2000 SN379" bgcolor=#fefefe
| 0 ||  || MBA-I || 18.2 || data-sort-value="0.68" | 680 m || multiple || 2000–2019 || 28 Nov 2019 || 68 || align=left | Disc.: Spacewatch || 
|- id="2000 SR379" bgcolor=#E9E9E9
| 0 ||  || MBA-M || 17.59 || 1.7 km || multiple || 2000–2021 || 17 Apr 2021 || 74 || align=left | Disc.: Kitt Peak || 
|- id="2000 ST379" bgcolor=#fefefe
| 0 ||  || MBA-I || 18.9 || data-sort-value="0.49" | 490 m || multiple || 2000–2020 || 10 Sep 2020 || 56 || align=left | Disc.: SDSS || 
|- id="2000 SU379" bgcolor=#d6d6d6
| 0 ||  || MBA-O || 16.82 || 2.4 km || multiple || 2000–2021 || 17 Apr 2021 || 62 || align=left | Disc.: Spacewatch || 
|- id="2000 SW379" bgcolor=#E9E9E9
| 0 ||  || MBA-M || 18.06 || data-sort-value="0.73" | 730 m || multiple || 2000–2022 || 26 Jan 2022 || 103 || align=left | Disc.: Kitt Peak || 
|- id="2000 SX379" bgcolor=#d6d6d6
| 0 ||  || MBA-O || 17.1 || 2.1 km || multiple || 2000–2021 || 18 Jan 2021 || 52 || align=left | Disc.: SDSS || 
|- id="2000 SY379" bgcolor=#d6d6d6
| 0 ||  || MBA-O || 16.24 || 3.1 km || multiple || 2000–2021 || 12 Jun 2021 || 99 || align=left | Disc.: SDSS || 
|- id="2000 SZ379" bgcolor=#fefefe
| 0 ||  || MBA-I || 18.8 || data-sort-value="0.52" | 520 m || multiple || 2000–2020 || 23 Jul 2020 || 71 || align=left | Disc.: Spacewatch || 
|- id="2000 SA380" bgcolor=#d6d6d6
| 0 ||  || MBA-O || 17.0 || 2.2 km || multiple || 2000–2020 || 14 May 2020 || 52 || align=left | Disc.: Kitt Peak || 
|- id="2000 SB380" bgcolor=#E9E9E9
| 0 ||  || MBA-M || 18.05 || data-sort-value="0.73" | 730 m || multiple || 2000–2021 || 09 Nov 2021 || 71 || align=left | Disc.: Kitt Peak || 
|- id="2000 SC380" bgcolor=#d6d6d6
| 0 ||  || MBA-O || 16.5 || 2.8 km || multiple || 2000–2021 || 08 Jun 2021 || 55 || align=left | Disc.: Spacewatch || 
|- id="2000 SE380" bgcolor=#d6d6d6
| 0 ||  || MBA-O || 16.87 || 2.4 km || multiple || 2000–2021 || 27 Nov 2021 || 91 || align=left | Disc.: Spacewatch || 
|- id="2000 SF380" bgcolor=#fefefe
| 0 ||  || MBA-I || 18.1 || data-sort-value="0.71" | 710 m || multiple || 2000–2018 || 11 Jul 2018 || 50 || align=left | Disc.: SDSS || 
|- id="2000 SG380" bgcolor=#E9E9E9
| 0 ||  || MBA-M || 18.09 || data-sort-value="0.72" | 720 m || multiple || 2000–2021 || 09 Nov 2021 || 79 || align=left | Disc.: Spacewatch || 
|- id="2000 SH380" bgcolor=#d6d6d6
| 0 ||  || MBA-O || 17.21 || 2.0 km || multiple || 2000–2021 || 09 Nov 2021 || 87 || align=left | Disc.: Spacewatch || 
|- id="2000 SJ380" bgcolor=#E9E9E9
| 0 ||  || MBA-M || 17.78 || data-sort-value="0.83" | 830 m || multiple || 2000–2021 || 03 Dec 2021 || 89 || align=left | Disc.: Kitt Peak || 
|- id="2000 SM380" bgcolor=#E9E9E9
| 0 ||  || MBA-M || 17.40 || 1.4 km || multiple || 2000–2021 || 02 Oct 2021 || 68 || align=left | Disc.: SDSS || 
|- id="2000 SN380" bgcolor=#E9E9E9
| 0 ||  || MBA-M || 17.85 || 1.1 km || multiple || 2000–2021 || 27 Oct 2021 || 110 || align=left | Disc.: Spacewatch || 
|- id="2000 SO380" bgcolor=#E9E9E9
| 0 ||  || MBA-M || 17.69 || data-sort-value="0.86" | 860 m || multiple || 2000–2021 || 08 Nov 2021 || 81 || align=left | Disc.: SDSS || 
|- id="2000 SQ380" bgcolor=#E9E9E9
| 1 ||  || MBA-M || 18.2 || data-sort-value="0.96" | 960 m || multiple || 2000–2017 || 13 Nov 2017 || 43 || align=left | Disc.: Spacewatch || 
|- id="2000 SR380" bgcolor=#E9E9E9
| 0 ||  || MBA-M || 17.61 || data-sort-value="0.89" | 890 m || multiple || 2000–2021 || 19 Nov 2021 || 71 || align=left | Disc.: SDSS || 
|- id="2000 SS380" bgcolor=#fefefe
| 1 ||  || MBA-I || 18.3 || data-sort-value="0.65" | 650 m || multiple || 2000–2018 || 14 Jun 2018 || 51 || align=left | Disc.: Kitt Peak || 
|- id="2000 ST380" bgcolor=#fefefe
| 0 ||  || MBA-I || 18.54 || data-sort-value="0.58" | 580 m || multiple || 2000–2021 || 27 Nov 2021 || 88 || align=left | Disc.: SDSS || 
|- id="2000 SU380" bgcolor=#fefefe
| 0 ||  || MBA-I || 18.5 || data-sort-value="0.59" | 590 m || multiple || 2000–2021 || 08 Jan 2021 || 53 || align=left | Disc.: Kitt Peak || 
|- id="2000 SV380" bgcolor=#fefefe
| 0 ||  || MBA-I || 18.97 || data-sort-value="0.48" | 480 m || multiple || 2000–2021 || 11 Nov 2021 || 82 || align=left | Disc.: Spacewatch || 
|- id="2000 SX380" bgcolor=#fefefe
| 0 ||  || MBA-I || 19.3 || data-sort-value="0.41" | 410 m || multiple || 2000–2019 || 04 Sep 2019 || 174 || align=left | Disc.: Spacewatch || 
|- id="2000 SY380" bgcolor=#fefefe
| 0 ||  || MBA-I || 19.07 || data-sort-value="0.46" | 460 m || multiple || 2000–2022 || 05 Jan 2022 || 74 || align=left | Disc.: Spacewatch || 
|- id="2000 SZ380" bgcolor=#E9E9E9
| 0 ||  || MBA-M || 17.88 || 1.1 km || multiple || 2000–2021 || 28 Oct 2021 || 49 || align=left | Disc.: SDSS || 
|- id="2000 SA381" bgcolor=#fefefe
| 0 ||  || MBA-I || 18.32 || data-sort-value="0.64" | 640 m || multiple || 2000–2021 || 03 May 2021 || 82 || align=left | Disc.: SDSS || 
|- id="2000 SB381" bgcolor=#E9E9E9
| 0 ||  || MBA-M || 17.97 || 1.1 km || multiple || 2000–2021 || 06 Nov 2021 || 78 || align=left | Disc.: SDSS || 
|- id="2000 SC381" bgcolor=#E9E9E9
| 0 ||  || MBA-M || 18.01 || 1.1 km || multiple || 2000–2021 || 03 Oct 2021 || 61 || align=left | Disc.: SDSS || 
|- id="2000 SE381" bgcolor=#E9E9E9
| 0 ||  || MBA-M || 16.60 || 2.7 km || multiple || 2000–2022 || 10 Jan 2022 || 61 || align=left | Disc.: SDSS || 
|- id="2000 SF381" bgcolor=#d6d6d6
| 0 ||  || MBA-O || 16.66 || 2.6 km || multiple || 2000–2021 || 16 Aug 2021 || 84 || align=left | Disc.: SDSSAdded on 17 June 2021Alt.: 2010 JO3 || 
|- id="2000 SG381" bgcolor=#E9E9E9
| 0 ||  || MBA-M || 17.83 || data-sort-value="0.81" | 810 m || multiple || 2000–2022 || 06 Jan 2022 || 148 || align=left | Disc.: SDSS || 
|- id="2000 SH381" bgcolor=#d6d6d6
| 0 ||  || MBA-O || 16.9 || 2.3 km || multiple || 2000–2017 || 13 Dec 2017 || 40 || align=left | Disc.: SDSS || 
|- id="2000 SJ381" bgcolor=#E9E9E9
| 0 ||  || MBA-M || 17.96 || 1.1 km || multiple || 2000–2021 || 04 Oct 2021 || 77 || align=left | Disc.: Spacewatch || 
|- id="2000 SK381" bgcolor=#fefefe
| 0 ||  || MBA-I || 18.63 || data-sort-value="0.56" | 560 m || multiple || 2000–2017 || 13 Nov 2017 || 40 || align=left | Disc.: Spacewatch || 
|- id="2000 SN381" bgcolor=#d6d6d6
| 0 ||  || MBA-O || 16.6 || 2.7 km || multiple || 2000–2020 || 24 Jan 2020 || 37 || align=left | Disc.: SDSS || 
|- id="2000 SO381" bgcolor=#E9E9E9
| 0 ||  || MBA-M || 17.94 || data-sort-value="0.77" | 770 m || multiple || 2000–2021 || 27 Nov 2021 || 39 || align=left | Disc.: Kitt Peak || 
|- id="2000 SQ381" bgcolor=#d6d6d6
| 0 ||  || MBA-O || 17.17 || 2.0 km || multiple || 2000–2021 || 30 May 2021 || 37 || align=left | Disc.: SDSS || 
|- id="2000 SR381" bgcolor=#d6d6d6
| 0 ||  || MBA-O || 16.7 || 2.5 km || multiple || 2000–2021 || 09 Jun 2021 || 73 || align=left | Disc.: SDSSAlt.: 2010 OZ112 || 
|- id="2000 SS381" bgcolor=#fefefe
| 0 ||  || HUN || 19.25 || data-sort-value="0.42" | 420 m || multiple || 2000–2021 || 28 Sep 2021 || 36 || align=left | Disc.: Spacewatch || 
|- id="2000 ST381" bgcolor=#d6d6d6
| 0 ||  || MBA-O || 17.0 || 2.2 km || multiple || 2000–2019 || 08 Jan 2019 || 24 || align=left | Disc.: SDSS || 
|- id="2000 SV381" bgcolor=#E9E9E9
| 0 ||  || MBA-M || 17.4 || 1.4 km || multiple || 2000–2020 || 20 Jan 2020 || 32 || align=left | Disc.: SDSS || 
|- id="2000 SW381" bgcolor=#d6d6d6
| 0 ||  || MBA-O || 16.7 || 2.5 km || multiple || 2000–2020 || 11 Oct 2020 || 35 || align=left | Disc.: SDSS || 
|- id="2000 SX381" bgcolor=#E9E9E9
| 0 ||  || MBA-M || 17.53 || 1.3 km || multiple || 2000–2021 || 16 May 2021 || 65 || align=left | Disc.: Spacewatch || 
|- id="2000 SB382" bgcolor=#E9E9E9
| 0 ||  || MBA-M || 17.0 || 2.2 km || multiple || 2000–2021 || 16 Jan 2021 || 85 || align=left | Disc.: SDSS || 
|- id="2000 SC382" bgcolor=#E9E9E9
| 0 ||  || MBA-M || 17.48 || 1.8 km || multiple || 1994–2021 || 19 Mar 2021 || 141 || align=left | Disc.: SDSS || 
|- id="2000 SF382" bgcolor=#fefefe
| 0 ||  || MBA-I || 17.3 || 1.0 km || multiple || 2000–2021 || 15 Jan 2021 || 91 || align=left | Disc.: SDSS || 
|- id="2000 SH382" bgcolor=#E9E9E9
| 0 ||  || MBA-M || 17.3 || 1.9 km || multiple || 1995–2019 || 28 Nov 2019 || 74 || align=left | Disc.: Spacewatch || 
|- id="2000 SK382" bgcolor=#C2FFFF
| 0 ||  || JT || 14.2 || 8.0 km || multiple || 2000–2020 || 14 Jul 2020 || 98 || align=left | Disc.: SDSSTrojan camp (L5) || 
|- id="2000 SL382" bgcolor=#fefefe
| 0 ||  || MBA-I || 18.79 || data-sort-value="0.52" | 520 m || multiple || 2000–2021 || 08 May 2021 || 67 || align=left | Disc.: Kitt Peak || 
|- id="2000 SN382" bgcolor=#E9E9E9
| 0 ||  || MBA-M || 17.12 || 2.1 km || multiple || 2000–2021 || 13 May 2021 || 71 || align=left | Disc.: Spacewatch || 
|- id="2000 SO382" bgcolor=#d6d6d6
| 0 ||  || MBA-O || 16.84 || 2.4 km || multiple || 2000–2021 || 13 Jul 2021 || 107 || align=left | Disc.: SDSS || 
|- id="2000 SQ382" bgcolor=#fefefe
| 0 ||  || HUN || 18.69 || data-sort-value="0.54" | 540 m || multiple || 2000–2021 || 08 May 2021 || 69 || align=left | Disc.: Spacewatch || 
|- id="2000 SR382" bgcolor=#E9E9E9
| 0 ||  || MBA-M || 17.6 || 1.7 km || multiple || 2000–2020 || 22 Jan 2020 || 54 || align=left | Disc.: Spacewatch || 
|- id="2000 SS382" bgcolor=#fefefe
| 0 ||  || MBA-I || 18.32 || data-sort-value="0.64" | 640 m || multiple || 2000–2021 || 05 May 2021 || 51 || align=left | Disc.: Spacewatch || 
|- id="2000 ST382" bgcolor=#E9E9E9
| 0 ||  || MBA-M || 17.78 || data-sort-value="0.83" | 830 m || multiple || 2000–2021 || 08 Dec 2021 || 56 || align=left | Disc.: SDSS || 
|- id="2000 SU382" bgcolor=#E9E9E9
| 0 ||  || MBA-M || 16.9 || 2.3 km || multiple || 2000–2018 || 06 Nov 2018 || 46 || align=left | Disc.: SDSS || 
|- id="2000 SX382" bgcolor=#E9E9E9
| 0 ||  || MBA-M || 16.86 || 2.4 km || multiple || 2000–2021 || 10 Apr 2021 || 82 || align=left | Disc.: SDSS || 
|- id="2000 SY382" bgcolor=#fefefe
| 0 ||  || MBA-I || 17.8 || data-sort-value="0.82" | 820 m || multiple || 2000–2019 || 31 Oct 2019 || 43 || align=left | Disc.: SDSS || 
|- id="2000 SA383" bgcolor=#fefefe
| 0 ||  || MBA-I || 18.46 || data-sort-value="0.60" | 600 m || multiple || 2000–2021 || 08 May 2021 || 58 || align=left | Disc.: Spacewatch || 
|- id="2000 SB383" bgcolor=#E9E9E9
| 0 ||  || MBA-M || 17.4 || 1.8 km || multiple || 2000–2020 || 25 Jan 2020 || 59 || align=left | Disc.: Spacewatch || 
|- id="2000 SC383" bgcolor=#d6d6d6
| 0 ||  || MBA-O || 16.5 || 2.8 km || multiple || 2000–2019 || 28 Feb 2019 || 46 || align=left | Disc.: SDSS || 
|- id="2000 SD383" bgcolor=#E9E9E9
| 1 ||  || MBA-M || 17.3 || 1.9 km || multiple || 2000–2018 || 14 Aug 2018 || 43 || align=left | Disc.: Spacewatch || 
|- id="2000 SE383" bgcolor=#d6d6d6
| 0 ||  || MBA-O || 17.1 || 2.1 km || multiple || 2000–2019 || 07 Apr 2019 || 43 || align=left | Disc.: Spacewatch || 
|- id="2000 SF383" bgcolor=#E9E9E9
| 0 ||  || MBA-M || 17.1 || 2.1 km || multiple || 2000–2019 || 04 Dec 2019 || 49 || align=left | Disc.: Spacewatch || 
|- id="2000 SG383" bgcolor=#fefefe
| 0 ||  || MBA-I || 18.8 || data-sort-value="0.52" | 520 m || multiple || 2000–2019 || 19 Nov 2019 || 40 || align=left | Disc.: SDSS || 
|- id="2000 SJ383" bgcolor=#E9E9E9
| 0 ||  || MBA-M || 17.7 || 1.2 km || multiple || 2000–2020 || 16 May 2020 || 45 || align=left | Disc.: SDSS || 
|- id="2000 SL383" bgcolor=#E9E9E9
| 0 ||  || MBA-M || 17.85 || 1.1 km || multiple || 2000–2021 || 11 Jun 2021 || 62 || align=left | Disc.: Kitt Peak || 
|- id="2000 SM383" bgcolor=#E9E9E9
| 0 ||  || MBA-M || 16.8 || 2.4 km || multiple || 2000–2020 || 22 Dec 2020 || 55 || align=left | Disc.: SDSS || 
|- id="2000 SN383" bgcolor=#E9E9E9
| 0 ||  || MBA-M || 17.89 || 1.1 km || multiple || 2000–2021 || 13 Sep 2021 || 58 || align=left | Disc.: Kitt Peak || 
|- id="2000 SQ383" bgcolor=#fefefe
| 0 ||  || MBA-I || 18.36 || data-sort-value="0.63" | 630 m || multiple || 2000–2021 || 30 Nov 2021 || 103 || align=left | Disc.: Spacewatch || 
|- id="2000 SR383" bgcolor=#E9E9E9
| 0 ||  || MBA-M || 17.6 || 1.7 km || multiple || 2000–2019 || 05 Nov 2019 || 42 || align=left | Disc.: Spacewatch || 
|- id="2000 SS383" bgcolor=#E9E9E9
| 0 ||  || MBA-M || 17.7 || 1.6 km || multiple || 2000–2019 || 29 Nov 2019 || 39 || align=left | Disc.: SDSS || 
|- id="2000 ST383" bgcolor=#E9E9E9
| 0 ||  || MBA-M || 17.76 || data-sort-value="0.83" | 830 m || multiple || 1996–2022 || 25 Jan 2022 || 88 || align=left | Disc.: SDSS || 
|- id="2000 SU383" bgcolor=#d6d6d6
| 0 ||  || MBA-O || 17.1 || 2.1 km || multiple || 2000–2019 || 25 Jan 2019 || 34 || align=left | Disc.: SDSS || 
|- id="2000 SV383" bgcolor=#d6d6d6
| 0 ||  || MBA-O || 17.0 || 2.2 km || multiple || 2000–2020 || 20 May 2020 || 49 || align=left | Disc.: Kitt Peak || 
|- id="2000 SW383" bgcolor=#E9E9E9
| 0 ||  || MBA-M || 18.0 || 1.1 km || multiple || 2000–2019 || 04 Jan 2019 || 34 || align=left | Disc.: SDSS || 
|- id="2000 SX383" bgcolor=#E9E9E9
| 0 ||  || MBA-M || 17.5 || 1.8 km || multiple || 2000–2020 || 26 Jan 2020 || 43 || align=left | Disc.: SDSS || 
|- id="2000 SY383" bgcolor=#E9E9E9
| 0 ||  || MBA-M || 17.57 || 1.7 km || multiple || 2000–2021 || 12 May 2021 || 42 || align=left | Disc.: SDSS || 
|- id="2000 SZ383" bgcolor=#fefefe
| 0 ||  || MBA-I || 18.66 || data-sort-value="0.55" | 550 m || multiple || 2000–2021 || 08 May 2021 || 44 || align=left | Disc.: SDSS || 
|- id="2000 SA384" bgcolor=#fefefe
| 0 ||  || MBA-I || 18.8 || data-sort-value="0.52" | 520 m || multiple || 2000–2020 || 08 Dec 2020 || 46 || align=left | Disc.: Spacewatch || 
|- id="2000 SC384" bgcolor=#E9E9E9
| 0 ||  || MBA-M || 17.73 || 1.6 km || multiple || 2000–2021 || 06 Apr 2021 || 48 || align=left | Disc.: SDSS || 
|- id="2000 SD384" bgcolor=#fefefe
| 0 ||  || MBA-I || 18.3 || data-sort-value="0.65" | 650 m || multiple || 2000–2020 || 15 Jun 2020 || 31 || align=left | Disc.: SDSS || 
|- id="2000 SF384" bgcolor=#d6d6d6
| 0 ||  || MBA-O || 17.73 || 1.6 km || multiple || 1995–2021 || 08 Aug 2021 || 45 || align=left | Disc.: Kitt Peak || 
|- id="2000 SG384" bgcolor=#fefefe
| 2 ||  || MBA-I || 19.2 || data-sort-value="0.43" | 430 m || multiple || 2000–2018 || 11 Nov 2018 || 30 || align=left | Disc.: Spacewatch || 
|- id="2000 SH384" bgcolor=#FA8072
| 0 ||  || MCA || 19.8 || data-sort-value="0.46" | 460 m || multiple || 2000–2021 || 30 Sep 2021 || 32 || align=left | Disc.: Spacewatch || 
|- id="2000 SJ384" bgcolor=#C2FFFF
| 0 ||  || JT || 14.1 || 8.4 km || multiple || 2000–2020 || 17 Jul 2020 || 89 || align=left | Disc.: Kitt PeakTrojan camp (L5) || 
|- id="2000 SL384" bgcolor=#E9E9E9
| 0 ||  || MBA-M || 17.40 || 1.8 km || multiple || 2000–2021 || 03 May 2021 || 81 || align=left | Disc.: SDSS || 
|- id="2000 SM384" bgcolor=#fefefe
| 0 ||  || MBA-I || 18.3 || data-sort-value="0.65" | 650 m || multiple || 2000–2019 || 03 Oct 2019 || 59 || align=left | Disc.: Spacewatch || 
|- id="2000 SN384" bgcolor=#E9E9E9
| 0 ||  || MBA-M || 18.5 || data-sort-value="0.84" | 840 m || multiple || 2000–2019 || 05 Feb 2019 || 54 || align=left | Disc.: Kitt Peak || 
|- id="2000 SO384" bgcolor=#fefefe
| 0 ||  || MBA-I || 17.8 || data-sort-value="0.82" | 820 m || multiple || 2000–2019 || 22 Sep 2019 || 53 || align=left | Disc.: SDSS || 
|- id="2000 SP384" bgcolor=#fefefe
| 0 ||  || MBA-I || 18.2 || data-sort-value="0.68" | 680 m || multiple || 2000–2020 || 14 Dec 2020 || 55 || align=left | Disc.: Spacewatch || 
|- id="2000 SR384" bgcolor=#d6d6d6
| 0 ||  || MBA-O || 17.15 || 2.1 km || multiple || 2000–2021 || 28 Sep 2021 || 63 || align=left | Disc.: Spacewatch || 
|- id="2000 SS384" bgcolor=#C2FFFF
| 0 ||  || JT || 14.2 || 8.0 km || multiple || 2000–2020 || 24 Jun 2020 || 83 || align=left | Disc.: SDSSTrojan camp (L5) || 
|- id="2000 ST384" bgcolor=#fefefe
| 1 ||  || MBA-I || 18.6 || data-sort-value="0.57" | 570 m || multiple || 2000–2017 || 13 Nov 2017 || 48 || align=left | Disc.: Spacewatch || 
|- id="2000 SV384" bgcolor=#C2FFFF
| 0 ||  = (614872) || JT || 14.1 || 8.4 km || multiple || 2000–2020 || 15 Jun 2020 || 81 || align=left | Disc.: SDSSTrojan camp (L5) || 
|- id="2000 SW384" bgcolor=#E9E9E9
| 0 ||  || MBA-M || 18.1 || data-sort-value="0.71" | 710 m || multiple || 2000–2020 || 17 Oct 2020 || 52 || align=left | Disc.: SDSS || 
|- id="2000 SX384" bgcolor=#fefefe
| 0 ||  || MBA-I || 17.9 || data-sort-value="0.78" | 780 m || multiple || 2000–2021 || 18 Jan 2021 || 48 || align=left | Disc.: SDSS || 
|- id="2000 SY384" bgcolor=#fefefe
| 0 ||  || MBA-I || 18.8 || data-sort-value="0.52" | 520 m || multiple || 2000–2019 || 05 Nov 2019 || 41 || align=left | Disc.: Kitt Peak || 
|- id="2000 SZ384" bgcolor=#d6d6d6
| 0 ||  || MBA-O || 16.7 || 2.5 km || multiple || 2000–2020 || 27 Apr 2020 || 48 || align=left | Disc.: Kitt Peak || 
|- id="2000 SA385" bgcolor=#C2FFFF
| 0 ||  || JT || 14.39 || 7.4 km || multiple || 2000–2021 || 16 May 2021 || 71 || align=left | Disc.: SpacewatchTrojan camp (L5) || 
|- id="2000 SB385" bgcolor=#fefefe
| 1 ||  || MBA-I || 18.75 || data-sort-value="0.53" | 530 m || multiple || 2000–2019 || 03 Dec 2019 || 40 || align=left | Disc.: Kitt Peak || 
|- id="2000 SC385" bgcolor=#fefefe
| 0 ||  || MBA-I || 19.05 || data-sort-value="0.46" | 460 m || multiple || 2000–2021 || 09 Nov 2021 || 49 || align=left | Disc.: Kitt Peak || 
|- id="2000 SD385" bgcolor=#fefefe
| 0 ||  || MBA-I || 19.2 || data-sort-value="0.43" | 430 m || multiple || 2000–2019 || 05 Aug 2019 || 35 || align=left | Disc.: Kitt Peak || 
|- id="2000 SF385" bgcolor=#E9E9E9
| 0 ||  || MBA-M || 18.2 || data-sort-value="0.96" | 960 m || multiple || 2000–2019 || 08 Feb 2019 || 30 || align=left | Disc.: Kitt Peak || 
|- id="2000 SG385" bgcolor=#fefefe
| 0 ||  = (619214) || MBA-I || 18.3 || data-sort-value="0.65" | 650 m || multiple || 2000–2020 || 21 Apr 2020 || 48 || align=left | Disc.: SDSS || 
|- id="2000 SH385" bgcolor=#fefefe
| 0 ||  || MBA-I || 19.4 || data-sort-value="0.39" | 390 m || multiple || 2000–2020 || 13 Sep 2020 || 59 || align=left | Disc.: Kitt Peak || 
|- id="2000 SJ385" bgcolor=#E9E9E9
| 0 ||  || MBA-M || 17.86 || data-sort-value="0.80" | 800 m || multiple || 2000–2022 || 07 Jan 2022 || 48 || align=left | Disc.: Kitt Peak || 
|- id="2000 SL385" bgcolor=#fefefe
| 0 ||  || MBA-I || 18.0 || data-sort-value="0.75" | 750 m || multiple || 1999–2021 || 18 Jan 2021 || 61 || align=left | Disc.: Kitt PeakAlt.: 2010 JK108 || 
|- id="2000 SO385" bgcolor=#fefefe
| 0 ||  || MBA-I || 18.88 || data-sort-value="0.50" | 500 m || multiple || 2000–2021 || 09 Apr 2021 || 53 || align=left | Disc.: Spacewatch || 
|- id="2000 SP385" bgcolor=#d6d6d6
| 0 ||  || MBA-O || 17.56 || 1.7 km || multiple || 2000–2021 || 09 Aug 2021 || 50 || align=left | Disc.: Kitt Peak || 
|- id="2000 SR385" bgcolor=#d6d6d6
| 0 ||  || MBA-O || 17.4 || 1.8 km || multiple || 2000–2021 || 07 Jan 2021 || 59 || align=left | Disc.: SDSS || 
|- id="2000 SS385" bgcolor=#fefefe
| 0 ||  || MBA-I || 18.0 || data-sort-value="0.75" | 750 m || multiple || 2000–2021 || 18 Jan 2021 || 56 || align=left | Disc.: SDSS || 
|- id="2000 ST385" bgcolor=#E9E9E9
| 0 ||  || MBA-M || 17.90 || data-sort-value="0.78" | 780 m || multiple || 2000–2021 || 02 Dec 2021 || 127 || align=left | Disc.: SDSS || 
|- id="2000 SU385" bgcolor=#fefefe
| 0 ||  || MBA-I || 18.1 || data-sort-value="0.71" | 710 m || multiple || 2000–2019 || 08 Dec 2019 || 39 || align=left | Disc.: Spacewatch || 
|- id="2000 SV385" bgcolor=#E9E9E9
| 1 ||  || MBA-M || 18.3 || 1.2 km || multiple || 2000–2018 || 01 Nov 2018 || 41 || align=left | Disc.: Kitt Peak || 
|- id="2000 SW385" bgcolor=#fefefe
| 0 ||  || MBA-I || 18.80 || data-sort-value="0.52" | 520 m || multiple || 2000–2021 || 15 Apr 2021 || 37 || align=left | Disc.: Kitt Peak || 
|- id="2000 SX385" bgcolor=#E9E9E9
| 0 ||  || MBA-M || 16.8 || 2.4 km || multiple || 2000–2021 || 18 Jan 2021 || 75 || align=left | Disc.: SDSS || 
|- id="2000 SY385" bgcolor=#d6d6d6
| 0 ||  || MBA-O || 16.65 || 2.6 km || multiple || 2000–2021 || 01 May 2021 || 102 || align=left | Disc.: SDSSAlt.: 2010 CS257, 2010 PO7 || 
|- id="2000 SZ385" bgcolor=#fefefe
| 0 ||  || MBA-I || 18.7 || data-sort-value="0.54" | 540 m || multiple || 2000–2020 || 22 Mar 2020 || 63 || align=left | Disc.: Kitt Peak || 
|- id="2000 SA386" bgcolor=#d6d6d6
| 0 ||  || MBA-O || 16.98 || 2.2 km || multiple || 2000–2021 || 05 Jun 2021 || 41 || align=left | Disc.: Spacewatch || 
|- id="2000 SB386" bgcolor=#d6d6d6
| 0 ||  || MBA-O || 16.79 || 2.4 km || multiple || 2000–2021 || 16 Apr 2021 || 52 || align=left | Disc.: SDSS || 
|- id="2000 SD386" bgcolor=#E9E9E9
| 0 ||  || MBA-M || 17.5 || 1.8 km || multiple || 2000–2021 || 18 Jan 2021 || 50 || align=left | Disc.: SDSS || 
|- id="2000 SE386" bgcolor=#d6d6d6
| 0 ||  || MBA-O || 16.79 || 2.4 km || multiple || 2000–2021 || 14 Apr 2021 || 63 || align=left | Disc.: Kitt Peak || 
|- id="2000 SF386" bgcolor=#fefefe
| 1 ||  || MBA-I || 18.3 || data-sort-value="0.65" | 650 m || multiple || 2000–2020 || 03 Feb 2020 || 41 || align=left | Disc.: Kitt Peak || 
|- id="2000 SH386" bgcolor=#E9E9E9
| 0 ||  || MBA-M || 17.4 || 1.4 km || multiple || 2000–2021 || 11 Jun 2021 || 39 || align=left | Disc.: Spacewatch || 
|- id="2000 SJ386" bgcolor=#d6d6d6
| 0 ||  || MBA-O || 17.19 || 2.0 km || multiple || 2000–2021 || 30 Jun 2021 || 32 || align=left | Disc.: SDSS || 
|- id="2000 SK386" bgcolor=#d6d6d6
| 0 ||  || MBA-O || 17.03 || 2.2 km || multiple || 2000–2021 || 10 Oct 2021 || 117 || align=left | Disc.: Kitt Peak || 
|- id="2000 SL386" bgcolor=#E9E9E9
| 0 ||  || MBA-M || 18.45 || data-sort-value="0.61" | 610 m || multiple || 2000–2022 || 24 Jan 2022 || 40 || align=left | Disc.: SDSS || 
|- id="2000 SM386" bgcolor=#d6d6d6
| 0 ||  || MBA-O || 17.14 || 2.1 km || multiple || 2000–2021 || 11 Oct 2021 || 53 || align=left | Disc.: SDSS || 
|- id="2000 SN386" bgcolor=#E9E9E9
| 0 ||  || MBA-M || 17.21 || 2.0 km || multiple || 2000–2021 || 06 Apr 2021 || 46 || align=left | Disc.: SDSS || 
|- id="2000 SO386" bgcolor=#fefefe
| 0 ||  || MBA-I || 18.4 || data-sort-value="0.62" | 620 m || multiple || 2000–2015 || 13 Dec 2015 || 41 || align=left | Disc.: Spacewatch || 
|- id="2000 SP386" bgcolor=#E9E9E9
| 1 ||  || MBA-M || 19.01 || data-sort-value="0.66" | 660 m || multiple || 2000–2021 || 05 Sep 2021 || 29 || align=left | Disc.: Spacewatch || 
|- id="2000 SQ386" bgcolor=#E9E9E9
| 0 ||  || MBA-M || 17.6 || 1.7 km || multiple || 1995–2021 || 08 Jun 2021 || 63 || align=left | Disc.: SpacewatchAdded on 24 August 2020 || 
|- id="2000 SR386" bgcolor=#E9E9E9
| 0 ||  || MBA-M || 17.8 || data-sort-value="0.82" | 820 m || multiple || 2000–2020 || 22 Sep 2020 || 56 || align=left | Disc.: SpacewatchAdded on 17 January 2021 || 
|- id="2000 SS386" bgcolor=#d6d6d6
| 0 ||  || MBA-O || 16.71 || 2.5 km || multiple || 2000–2021 || 13 Jun 2021 || 62 || align=left | Disc.: SpacewatchAdded on 17 January 2021 || 
|- id="2000 ST386" bgcolor=#fefefe
| 2 ||  || MBA-I || 19.2 || data-sort-value="0.43" | 430 m || multiple || 2000–2019 || 02 Nov 2019 || 27 || align=left | Disc.: SpacewatchAdded on 17 January 2021 || 
|- id="2000 SV386" bgcolor=#E9E9E9
| 3 ||  || MBA-M || 18.8 || data-sort-value="0.73" | 730 m || multiple || 2000–2017 || 26 Oct 2017 || 21 || align=left | Disc.: SpacewatchAdded on 21 August 2021 || 
|- id="2000 SW386" bgcolor=#d6d6d6
| 0 ||  || MBA-O || 16.93 || 2.3 km || multiple || 2000–2021 || 13 Jun 2021 || 45 || align=left | Disc.: SpacewatchAdded on 21 August 2021 || 
|- id="2000 SX386" bgcolor=#E9E9E9
| 0 ||  || MBA-M || 18.67 || data-sort-value="0.78" | 780 m || multiple || 2000–2021 || 27 Oct 2021 || 61 || align=left | Disc.: SpacewatchAdded on 21 August 2021 || 
|- id="2000 SY386" bgcolor=#d6d6d6
| 0 ||  || MBA-O || 17.0 || 2.2 km || multiple || 2000–2021 || 06 Nov 2021 || 54 || align=left | Disc.: SDSSAdded on 24 December 2021 || 
|- id="2000 SZ386" bgcolor=#E9E9E9
| 1 ||  || MBA-M || 17.9 || 1.5 km || multiple || 2000–2018 || 07 Sep 2018 || 30 || align=left | Disc.: SpacewatchAdded on 29 January 2022 || 
|}
back to top

T 

|- id="2000 TE" bgcolor=#fefefe
| 0 || 2000 TE || MBA-I || 18.63 || data-sort-value="0.56" | 560 m || multiple || 2000–2021 || 17 Apr 2021 || 71 || align=left | Disc.: Prescott Obs.Alt.: 2016 UG55 || 
|- id="2000 TU" bgcolor=#fefefe
| 0 || 2000 TU || MBA-I || 18.34 || data-sort-value="0.64" | 640 m || multiple || 2000–2021 || 07 Jun 2021 || 53 || align=left | Disc.: LINEARAlt.: 2006 HJ144, 2011 SB128, 2011 UL206 || 
|- id="2000 TX" bgcolor=#fefefe
| 0 || 2000 TX || MBA-I || 17.9 || data-sort-value="0.78" | 780 m || multiple || 2000–2020 || 02 Apr 2020 || 74 || align=left | Disc.: LINEARAlt.: 2018 UZ16 || 
|- id="2000 TC1" bgcolor=#d6d6d6
| 1 ||  || MBA-O || 16.99 || 2.1 km || multiple || 2000-2022 || 21 Sep 2022 || 44 || align=left | Disc.: LINEAR || 
|- id="2000 TH1" bgcolor=#FFC2E0
| 1 ||  || AMO || 22.6 || data-sort-value="0.11" | 110 m || multiple || 2000–2014 || 26 Oct 2014 || 122 || align=left | Disc.: LINEAR || 
|- id="2000 TL1" bgcolor=#FFC2E0
| 0 ||  || APO || 23.5 || data-sort-value="0.071" | 71 m || multiple || 2000–2017 || 15 Oct 2017 || 42 || align=left | Disc.: LINEAR || 
|- id="2000 TR1" bgcolor=#E9E9E9
| 0 ||  || MBA-M || 17.91 || data-sort-value="0.78" | 780 m || multiple || 2000–2022 || 25 Jan 2022 || 62 || align=left | Disc.: LINEARAlt.: 2004 RE300 || 
|- id="2000 TS1" bgcolor=#E9E9E9
| 0 ||  || MBA-M || 17.4 || data-sort-value="0.98" | 980 m || multiple || 2000–2019 || 08 Apr 2019 || 46 || align=left | Disc.: LINEAR || 
|- id="2000 TV1" bgcolor=#E9E9E9
| 0 ||  || MBA-M || 17.70 || data-sort-value="0.86" | 860 m || multiple || 2000–2021 || 13 Dec 2021 || 50 || align=left | Disc.: LINEAR || 
|- id="2000 TE2" bgcolor=#FFC2E0
| 4 ||  || AMO || 24.9 || data-sort-value="0.037" | 37 m || single || 67 days || 01 Dec 2000 || 21 || align=left | Disc.: LINEAR || 
|- id="2000 TF2" bgcolor=#FA8072
| 2 ||  || MCA || 20.3 || data-sort-value="0.26" | 260 m || multiple || 2000–2013 || 28 Oct 2013 || 61 || align=left | Disc.: LINEARAlt.: 2013 SM19 || 
|- id="2000 TV3" bgcolor=#FA8072
| 0 ||  || MCA || 19.91 || data-sort-value="0.27" | 250 m || multiple || 2000–2022 || 26 Nov 2022 || 64 || align=left | Disc.: LINEARAlt.: 2019 WZ6 || 6
|- id="2000 TG4" bgcolor=#fefefe
| 0 ||  || MBA-I || 18.48 || data-sort-value="0.60" | 600 m || multiple || 2000–2021 || 13 Jul 2021 || 72 || align=left | Disc.: LINEAR || 
|- id="2000 TO4" bgcolor=#E9E9E9
| 0 ||  || MBA-M || 18.36 || data-sort-value="0.63" | 630 m || multiple || 2000–2021 || 28 Dec 2021 || 58 || align=left | Disc.: Emerald Lane Obs.Alt.: 2000 SS370 || 
|- id="2000 TW7" bgcolor=#FA8072
| 0 ||  || MCA || 18.65 || data-sort-value="0.55" | 550 m || multiple || 2000–2021 || 07 Sep 2021 || 127 || align=left | Disc.: LINEARAlt.: 2007 RA246 || 
|- id="2000 TD8" bgcolor=#E9E9E9
| 0 ||  || MBA-M || 17.3 || 1.0 km || multiple || 2000–2020 || 13 Jul 2020 || 66 || align=left | Disc.: LINEAR || 
|- id="2000 TS9" bgcolor=#E9E9E9
| 2 ||  || MBA-M || 18.11 || 1.3 km || multiple || 2000–2022 || 21 Jul 2022 || 46 || align=left | Disc.: LINEARAdded on 22 July 2020Alt.: 2018 VQ69 || 
|- id="2000 TR10" bgcolor=#fefefe
| 0 ||  || MBA-I || 17.92 || data-sort-value="0.77" | 770 m || multiple || 2000–2021 || 03 Apr 2021 || 160 || align=left | Disc.: LINEARAlt.: 2015 UG84 || 
|- id="2000 TH14" bgcolor=#FA8072
| – ||  || MCA || 19.5 || data-sort-value="0.37" | 370 m || single || 17 days || 18 Oct 2000 || 16 || align=left | Disc.: LINEAR || 
|- id="2000 TM15" bgcolor=#E9E9E9
| 0 ||  || MBA-M || 17.48 || 1.8 km || multiple || 2000–2021 || 05 May 2021 || 161 || align=left | Disc.: LINEAR || 
|- id="2000 TB23" bgcolor=#E9E9E9
| 0 ||  || MBA-M || 18.3 || data-sort-value="0.92" | 920 m || multiple || 2000–2018 || 16 Dec 2018 || 51 || align=left | Disc.: LINEAR || 
|- id="2000 TU23" bgcolor=#d6d6d6
| 0 ||  || MBA-O || 16.6 || 2.7 km || multiple || 2000–2019 || 15 Jan 2019 || 39 || align=left | Disc.: LINEAR || 
|- id="2000 TK25" bgcolor=#fefefe
| 0 ||  || MBA-I || 17.3 || 1.0 km || multiple || 2000–2021 || 07 Jan 2021 || 77 || align=left | Disc.: LINEARAlt.: 2004 VD52, 2007 HG77, 2008 UW77, 2011 KW29 || 
|- id="2000 TU26" bgcolor=#fefefe
| 0 ||  || MBA-I || 18.51 || data-sort-value="0.59" | 590 m || multiple || 2000–2021 || 08 Jun 2021 || 57 || align=left | Disc.: LINEARAlt.: 2018 VG35 || 
|- id="2000 TU28" bgcolor=#FFC2E0
| 2 ||  || APO || 21.1 || data-sort-value="0.21" | 210 m || multiple || 2000–2020 || 06 Nov 2020 || 250 || align=left | Disc.: LINEARPotentially hazardous object || 
|- id="2000 TV28" bgcolor=#FFC2E0
| 1 ||  || AMO || 21.6 || data-sort-value="0.17" | 170 m || multiple || 2000–2020 || 18 Dec 2020 || 56 || align=left | Disc.: Spacewatch || 
|- id="2000 TE30" bgcolor=#E9E9E9
| 0 ||  || MBA-M || 18.48 || data-sort-value="0.85" | 850 m || multiple || 2000–2021 || 27 Oct 2021 || 47 || align=left | Disc.: Spacewatch || 
|- id="2000 TH30" bgcolor=#fefefe
| 0 ||  || MBA-I || 18.0 || data-sort-value="0.75" | 750 m || multiple || 1996–2019 || 21 Dec 2019 || 87 || align=left | Disc.: Spacewatch || 
|- id="2000 TN30" bgcolor=#fefefe
| 1 ||  || MBA-I || 18.6 || data-sort-value="0.57" | 570 m || multiple || 2000–2021 || 08 Sep 2021 || 51 || align=left | Disc.: SpacewatchAlt.: 2007 RP257, 2014 QT229 || 
|- id="2000 TO30" bgcolor=#d6d6d6
| 0 ||  || MBA-O || 17.27 || 2.0 km || multiple || 2000–2021 || 28 Sep 2021 || 50 || align=left | Disc.: Spacewatch || 
|- id="2000 TC31" bgcolor=#fefefe
| 0 ||  || MBA-I || 18.42 || data-sort-value="0.62" | 620 m || multiple || 2000–2018 || 10 Nov 2018 || 67 || align=left | Disc.: SpacewatchAlt.: 2014 ND61 || 
|- id="2000 TA32" bgcolor=#d6d6d6
| 0 ||  || MBA-O || 18.05 || 1.4 km || multiple || 2000–2021 || 03 Oct 2021 || 36 || align=left | Disc.: SpacewatchAdded on 30 September 2021 || 
|- id="2000 TE32" bgcolor=#d6d6d6
| 0 ||  || MBA-O || 16.68 || 2.6 km || multiple || 2000–2021 || 13 Apr 2021 || 76 || align=left | Disc.: Spacewatch || 
|- id="2000 TF32" bgcolor=#E9E9E9
| 2 ||  || MBA-M || 18.9 || data-sort-value="0.49" | 490 m || multiple || 2000–2020 || 15 Sep 2020 || 62 || align=left | Disc.: Spacewatch || 
|- id="2000 TH32" bgcolor=#fefefe
| 0 ||  || MBA-I || 17.8 || data-sort-value="0.82" | 820 m || multiple || 1999–2021 || 18 Jan 2021 || 184 || align=left | Disc.: SpacewatchAlt.: 2005 BL45, 2016 UW3 || 
|- id="2000 TP32" bgcolor=#E9E9E9
| 0 ||  || MBA-M || 18.50 || data-sort-value="0.84" | 840 m || multiple || 2000–2021 || 03 Oct 2021 || 64 || align=left | Disc.: Spacewatch || 
|- id="2000 TA33" bgcolor=#FA8072
| 0 ||  || MCA || 17.50 || data-sort-value="0.94" | 940 m || multiple || 2000–2022 || 06 Jan 2022 || 81 || align=left | Disc.: LINEARAlt.: 2004 QH20 || 
|- id="2000 TM42" bgcolor=#E9E9E9
| 0 ||  || MBA-M || 17.03 || 1.7 km || multiple || 2000–2021 || 03 Dec 2021 || 253 || align=left | Disc.: LINEAR || 
|- id="2000 TE43" bgcolor=#FA8072
| 0 ||  || MCA || 18.23 || data-sort-value="0.67" | 670 m || multiple || 2000–2022 || 01 Jan 2022 || 90 || align=left | Disc.: LINEAR || 
|- id="2000 TJ47" bgcolor=#E9E9E9
| 0 ||  || MBA-M || 16.75 || 2.5 km || multiple || 2000–2021 || 30 May 2021 || 185 || align=left | Disc.: LONEOSAlt.: 2008 KD37, 2014 WT490, 2016 EC186, 2018 UT15 || 
|- id="2000 TF49" bgcolor=#fefefe
| 0 ||  || MBA-I || 16.7 || 1.4 km || multiple || 2000–2021 || 10 Jan 2021 || 164 || align=left | Disc.: LONEOSAlt.: 2014 FW50, 2015 ND6 || 
|- id="2000 TH49" bgcolor=#fefefe
| 0 ||  || MBA-I || 17.58 || data-sort-value="0.91" | 910 m || multiple || 2000–2021 || 03 May 2021 || 71 || align=left | Disc.: LONEOS || 
|- id="2000 TM49" bgcolor=#fefefe
| 0 ||  || MBA-I || 17.2 || 1.1 km || multiple || 2000–2021 || 16 Jan 2021 || 103 || align=left | Disc.: LINEARAlt.: 2008 WY132, 2012 XX149 || 
|- id="2000 TA50" bgcolor=#E9E9E9
| 0 ||  || MBA-M || 17.2 || 1.1 km || multiple || 2000–2020 || 08 Nov 2020 || 94 || align=left | Disc.: LONEOS || 
|- id="2000 TL52" bgcolor=#fefefe
| 0 ||  || MBA-I || 18.6 || data-sort-value="0.57" | 570 m || multiple || 2000–2020 || 20 Oct 2020 || 69 || align=left | Disc.: LINEAR || 
|- id="2000 TN56" bgcolor=#E9E9E9
| 0 ||  || MBA-M || 17.52 || 1.3 km || multiple || 2000–2022 || 09 Jun 2022 || 53 || align=left | Disc.: LONEOSAlt.: 2009 UH137 || 
|- id="2000 TX56" bgcolor=#fefefe
| 0 ||  || MBA-I || 17.9 || data-sort-value="0.78" | 780 m || multiple || 2000–2019 || 28 Nov 2019 || 87 || align=left | Disc.: LINEARAlt.: 2015 PA156 || 
|- id="2000 TW59" bgcolor=#fefefe
| 0 ||  || MBA-I || 17.0 || 1.2 km || multiple || 2000–2021 || 18 Jan 2021 || 178 || align=left | Disc.: LINEARAlt.: 2003 HW9, 2014 FJ47, 2015 TN344 || 
|- id="2000 TF61" bgcolor=#E9E9E9
| 0 ||  || MBA-M || 17.62 || 1.3 km || multiple || 2000–2022 || 04 Jan 2022 || 142 || align=left | Disc.: LINEARAdded on 21 August 2021 || 
|- id="2000 TC64" bgcolor=#E9E9E9
| 0 ||  || MBA-M || 17.85 || data-sort-value="0.80" | 800 m || multiple || 2000–2022 || 24 Jan 2022 || 71 || align=left | Disc.: LINEARAlt.: 2004 SU1 || 
|- id="2000 TW64" bgcolor=#E9E9E9
| 0 ||  || MBA-M || 17.31 || 1.0 km || multiple || 2000–2021 || 08 Dec 2021 || 120 || align=left | Disc.: LINEAR || 
|- id="2000 TJ69" bgcolor=#E9E9E9
| 0 ||  || MBA-M || 17.48 || 1.8 km || multiple || 2000–2021 || 03 May 2021 || 76 || align=left | Disc.: SpacewatchAlt.: 2014 WT321 || 
|- id="2000 TL72" bgcolor=#E9E9E9
| 0 ||  || MBA-M || 18.24 || 1.3 km || multiple || 2000–2020 || 21 Jan 2020 || 26 || align=left | Disc.: SDSSAdded on 24 December 2021 || 
|- id="2000 TQ72" bgcolor=#d6d6d6
| 0 ||  || MBA-O || 17.0 || 2.2 km || multiple || 2000–2021 || 08 Aug 2021 || 37 || align=left | Disc.: SDSSAdded on 21 August 2021 || 
|- id="2000 TR72" bgcolor=#fefefe
| 0 ||  || MBA-I || 18.03 || data-sort-value="0.74" | 740 m || multiple || 2000–2022 || 07 Jan 2022 || 193 || align=left | Disc.: SDSSAlt.: 2016 GJ168 || 
|- id="2000 TT72" bgcolor=#fefefe
| 0 ||  = (547766) || MBA-I || 18.46 || data-sort-value="0.68" | 650 m || multiple || 2008-2022 || 27 Apr 2022 || 68 || align=left | Disc.: SDSS || 
|- id="2000 TU72" bgcolor=#E9E9E9
| 3 ||  || MBA-M || 19.1 || data-sort-value="0.64" | 640 m || multiple || 2000–2017 || 25 Oct 2017 || 23 || align=left | Disc.: SDSS || 
|- id="2000 TV72" bgcolor=#fefefe
| 0 ||  || MBA-I || 18.7 || data-sort-value="0.54" | 540 m || multiple || 2000–2020 || 24 Jan 2020 || 30 || align=left | Disc.: SDSS || 
|- id="2000 TA73" bgcolor=#d6d6d6
| 0 ||  || MBA-O || 16.87 || 2.4 km || multiple || 2000–2021 || 08 Aug 2021 || 88 || align=left | Disc.: SDSS || 
|- id="2000 TJ73" bgcolor=#fefefe
| 0 ||  || MBA-I || 16.8 || 1.3 km || multiple || 2000–2021 || 18 Jan 2021 || 84 || align=left | Disc.: SDSSAlt.: 2008 WV160, 2014 EV256 || 
|- id="2000 TL73" bgcolor=#d6d6d6
| 1 ||  || MBA-O || 17.53 || 1.7 km || multiple || 2000–2017 || 25 Dec 2017 || 29 || align=left | Disc.: SDSSAdded on 29 January 2022 || 
|- id="2000 TS73" bgcolor=#d6d6d6
| 0 ||  || MBA-O || 16.71 || 2.5 km || multiple || 2000–2021 || 03 Oct 2021 || 92 || align=left | Disc.: SDSS || 
|- id="2000 TY74" bgcolor=#d6d6d6
| 0 ||  || MBA-O || 16.8 || 2.4 km || multiple || 2000–2020 || 19 Apr 2020 || 56 || align=left | Disc.: LONEOSAlt.: 2011 SO214 || 
|- id="2000 TC75" bgcolor=#E9E9E9
| 0 ||  || MBA-M || 17.35 || 1.9 km || multiple || 1994–2021 || 31 Mar 2021 || 126 || align=left | Disc.: Spacewatch || 
|- id="2000 TE75" bgcolor=#fefefe
| 0 ||  || MBA-I || 18.0 || data-sort-value="0.75" | 750 m || multiple || 2000–2021 || 13 Jan 2021 || 112 || align=left | Disc.: Spacewatch || 
|- id="2000 TF75" bgcolor=#E9E9E9
| 0 ||  || MBA-M || 16.43 || 2.9 km || multiple || 2000–2021 || 14 Jun 2021 || 163 || align=left | Disc.: SDSS || 
|- id="2000 TG75" bgcolor=#fefefe
| 0 ||  || MBA-I || 17.72 || data-sort-value="0.85" | 850 m || multiple || 2000–2021 || 11 May 2021 || 120 || align=left | Disc.: LONEOS || 
|- id="2000 TJ75" bgcolor=#E9E9E9
| 0 ||  || MBA-M || 17.12 || 1.1 km || multiple || 2000–2021 || 28 Nov 2021 || 160 || align=left | Disc.: SDSS || 
|- id="2000 TK75" bgcolor=#E9E9E9
| 0 ||  || MBA-M || 17.44 || 1.8 km || multiple || 2000–2021 || 15 Apr 2021 || 105 || align=left | Disc.: SDSS || 
|- id="2000 TL75" bgcolor=#d6d6d6
| 0 ||  || MBA-O || 16.4 || 2.9 km || multiple || 2000–2020 || 23 Apr 2020 || 112 || align=left | Disc.: SDSS || 
|- id="2000 TM75" bgcolor=#fefefe
| 0 ||  || MBA-I || 18.23 || data-sort-value="0.67" | 670 m || multiple || 2000–2021 || 11 May 2021 || 94 || align=left | Disc.: SDSS || 
|- id="2000 TP75" bgcolor=#d6d6d6
| 0 ||  || MBA-O || 16.59 || 2.7 km || multiple || 2000–2021 || 06 Nov 2021 || 100 || align=left | Disc.: SDSS || 
|- id="2000 TQ75" bgcolor=#d6d6d6
| 0 ||  || MBA-O || 16.3 || 3.1 km || multiple || 2000–2020 || 22 May 2020 || 98 || align=left | Disc.: SDSS || 
|- id="2000 TS75" bgcolor=#d6d6d6
| 0 ||  || MBA-O || 16.7 || 2.5 km || multiple || 2000–2019 || 28 Feb 2019 || 77 || align=left | Disc.: Spacewatch || 
|- id="2000 TV75" bgcolor=#E9E9E9
| 0 ||  || MBA-M || 17.66 || data-sort-value="0.87" | 870 m || multiple || 2000–2022 || 12 Jan 2022 || 87 || align=left | Disc.: SDSS || 
|- id="2000 TW75" bgcolor=#d6d6d6
| 0 ||  = (619215)  || MBA-O || 16.3 || 3.1 km || multiple || 2000–2019 || 09 May 2019 || 74 || align=left | Disc.: SDSS || 
|- id="2000 TX75" bgcolor=#d6d6d6
| 0 ||  || MBA-O || 16.57 || 2.7 km || multiple || 2000–2021 || 01 Nov 2021 || 135 || align=left | Disc.: SDSS || 
|- id="2000 TA76" bgcolor=#d6d6d6
| 0 ||  || MBA-O || 16.27 || 3.1 km || multiple || 2000–2021 || 05 Jul 2021 || 119 || align=left | Disc.: SDSS || 
|- id="2000 TC76" bgcolor=#d6d6d6
| 0 ||  || MBA-O || 16.7 || 2.5 km || multiple || 2000–2020 || 15 Apr 2020 || 71 || align=left | Disc.: SDSSAlt.: 2010 GE185 || 
|- id="2000 TD76" bgcolor=#fefefe
| 1 ||  || MBA-I || 18.0 || data-sort-value="0.75" | 750 m || multiple || 2000–2021 || 16 Jan 2021 || 73 || align=left | Disc.: AMOS || 
|- id="2000 TE76" bgcolor=#fefefe
| 0 ||  || MBA-I || 18.00 || data-sort-value="0.75" | 750 m || multiple || 2000–2021 || 11 May 2021 || 93 || align=left | Disc.: Spacewatch || 
|- id="2000 TF76" bgcolor=#E9E9E9
| 0 ||  || MBA-M || 17.84 || 1.1 km || multiple || 2000–2021 || 30 Sep 2021 || 115 || align=left | Disc.: Spacewatch || 
|- id="2000 TG76" bgcolor=#E9E9E9
| 0 ||  || MBA-M || 17.59 || 1.3 km || multiple || 2000–2021 || 27 Nov 2021 || 134 || align=left | Disc.: Spacewatch || 
|- id="2000 TH76" bgcolor=#d6d6d6
| 0 ||  || MBA-O || 16.61 || 2.7 km || multiple || 1995–2021 || 26 Nov 2021 || 166 || align=left | Disc.: SDSS || 
|- id="2000 TK76" bgcolor=#d6d6d6
| 0 ||  || MBA-O || 16.65 || 2.6 km || multiple || 2000–2021 || 07 Nov 2021 || 117 || align=left | Disc.: SDSS || 
|- id="2000 TO76" bgcolor=#E9E9E9
| 0 ||  || MBA-M || 17.49 || 1.3 km || multiple || 2000–2021 || 23 Nov 2021 || 95 || align=left | Disc.: SDSS || 
|- id="2000 TP76" bgcolor=#fefefe
| 0 ||  || MBA-I || 18.3 || data-sort-value="0.65" | 650 m || multiple || 2000–2021 || 17 Jan 2021 || 76 || align=left | Disc.: Spacewatch || 
|- id="2000 TQ76" bgcolor=#d6d6d6
| 0 ||  || MBA-O || 16.7 || 2.5 km || multiple || 2000–2020 || 29 Apr 2020 || 62 || align=left | Disc.: Spacewatch || 
|- id="2000 TT76" bgcolor=#C2FFFF
| 0 ||  || JT || 14.21 || 8.0 km || multiple || 1999–2021 || 07 Sep 2021 || 93 || align=left | Disc.: SDSSTrojan camp (L5)Alt.: 2010 HN21 || 
|- id="2000 TV76" bgcolor=#E9E9E9
| 0 ||  || MBA-M || 18.07 || 1.0 km || multiple || 2000–2021 || 09 Sep 2021 || 98 || align=left | Disc.: SDSS || 
|- id="2000 TW76" bgcolor=#d6d6d6
| 0 ||  = (619216) || MBA-O || 16.8 || 2.4 km || multiple || 2000–2019 || 26 Jan 2019 || 55 || align=left | Disc.: SDSS || 
|- id="2000 TY76" bgcolor=#E9E9E9
| 0 ||  || MBA-M || 17.45 || data-sort-value="0.96" | 960 m || multiple || 1996–2021 || 25 Nov 2021 || 125 || align=left | Disc.: Spacewatch || 
|- id="2000 TZ76" bgcolor=#fefefe
| 0 ||  || MBA-I || 18.4 || data-sort-value="0.62" | 620 m || multiple || 2000–2020 || 19 Oct 2020 || 141 || align=left | Disc.: Spacewatch || 
|- id="2000 TA77" bgcolor=#E9E9E9
| 0 ||  || MBA-M || 17.0 || 1.7 km || multiple || 2000–2019 || 08 Jan 2019 || 62 || align=left | Disc.: SDSSAlt.: 2004 ST11 || 
|- id="2000 TB77" bgcolor=#E9E9E9
| 0 ||  || MBA-M || 17.72 || 1.6 km || multiple || 2000–2021 || 08 Jul 2021 || 76 || align=left | Disc.: SDSS || 
|- id="2000 TC77" bgcolor=#E9E9E9
| 0 ||  || MBA-M || 17.2 || 1.5 km || multiple || 2000–2020 || 27 Apr 2020 || 55 || align=left | Disc.: SDSS || 
|- id="2000 TE77" bgcolor=#fefefe
| 0 ||  || MBA-I || 18.3 || data-sort-value="0.65" | 650 m || multiple || 2000–2017 || 26 Oct 2017 || 50 || align=left | Disc.: SDSS || 
|- id="2000 TH77" bgcolor=#E9E9E9
| 0 ||  || MBA-M || 17.61 || 1.3 km || multiple || 2000–2021 || 03 May 2021 || 59 || align=left | Disc.: SDSS || 
|- id="2000 TK77" bgcolor=#d6d6d6
| 0 ||  || MBA-O || 16.5 || 2.8 km || multiple || 2000–2021 || 13 Jun 2021 || 79 || align=left | Disc.: Spacewatch || 
|- id="2000 TM77" bgcolor=#fefefe
| 0 ||  || MBA-I || 18.0 || data-sort-value="0.75" | 750 m || multiple || 2000–2019 || 03 Oct 2019 || 81 || align=left | Disc.: SDSS || 
|- id="2000 TN77" bgcolor=#E9E9E9
| 0 ||  || MBA-M || 18.57 || data-sort-value="0.81" | 810 m || multiple || 2000–2021 || 07 Sep 2021 || 48 || align=left | Disc.: Spacewatch || 
|- id="2000 TO77" bgcolor=#E9E9E9
| 0 ||  || MBA-M || 16.50 || 2.8 km || multiple || 2000–2021 || 15 May 2021 || 142 || align=left | Disc.: SDSS || 
|- id="2000 TQ77" bgcolor=#d6d6d6
| 0 ||  || MBA-O || 16.49 || 2.8 km || multiple || 2000–2021 || 16 May 2021 || 91 || align=left | Disc.: SDSS || 
|- id="2000 TR77" bgcolor=#d6d6d6
| 0 ||  || MBA-O || 16.79 || 2.4 km || multiple || 2000–2021 || 03 May 2021 || 72 || align=left | Disc.: SDSS || 
|- id="2000 TS77" bgcolor=#E9E9E9
| 0 ||  || MBA-M || 17.79 || 1.2 km || multiple || 2000–2021 || 14 Apr 2021 || 55 || align=left | Disc.: SDSS || 
|- id="2000 TT77" bgcolor=#d6d6d6
| 0 ||  || MBA-O || 16.5 || 2.8 km || multiple || 2000–2020 || 02 Feb 2020 || 50 || align=left | Disc.: Spacewatch || 
|- id="2000 TU77" bgcolor=#d6d6d6
| 0 ||  || MBA-O || 16.9 || 2.3 km || multiple || 2000–2019 || 05 Feb 2019 || 41 || align=left | Disc.: Spacewatch || 
|- id="2000 TV77" bgcolor=#E9E9E9
| 0 ||  || MBA-M || 17.5 || 1.8 km || multiple || 2000–2019 || 04 Dec 2019 || 45 || align=left | Disc.: SDSS || 
|- id="2000 TW77" bgcolor=#d6d6d6
| 0 ||  || MBA-O || 16.8 || 2.4 km || multiple || 2000–2020 || 25 May 2020 || 45 || align=left | Disc.: SDSS || 
|- id="2000 TX77" bgcolor=#fefefe
| 0 ||  || HUN || 18.57 || data-sort-value="0.57" | 570 m || multiple || 2000–2021 || 05 Jun 2021 || 85 || align=left | Disc.: SDSS || 
|- id="2000 TY77" bgcolor=#fefefe
| 1 ||  || MBA-I || 18.64 || data-sort-value="0.56" | 560 m || multiple || 2000–2021 || 11 Sep 2021 || 39 || align=left | Disc.: SDSS || 
|- id="2000 TZ77" bgcolor=#d6d6d6
| 0 ||  || MBA-O || 16.2 || 3.2 km || multiple || 2000–2019 || 04 Jan 2019 || 49 || align=left | Disc.: SDSS || 
|- id="2000 TC78" bgcolor=#E9E9E9
| 0 ||  = (619217) || MBA-M || 17.3 || 1.5 km || multiple || 2000–2020 || 16 Feb 2020 || 49 || align=left | Disc.: SDSS || 
|- id="2000 TE78" bgcolor=#fefefe
| 0 ||  || MBA-I || 17.5 || data-sort-value="0.94" | 940 m || multiple || 2000–2019 || 30 Nov 2019 || 61 || align=left | Disc.: SDSS || 
|- id="2000 TG78" bgcolor=#E9E9E9
| 0 ||  || MBA-M || 18.02 || 1.0 km || multiple || 2000–2021 || 26 Nov 2021 || 56 || align=left | Disc.: SDSS || 
|- id="2000 TH78" bgcolor=#E9E9E9
| 0 ||  || MBA-M || 18.00 || 1.1 km || multiple || 2000–2021 || 01 Nov 2021 || 65 || align=left | Disc.: Spacewatch || 
|- id="2000 TJ78" bgcolor=#d6d6d6
| 2 ||  || MBA-O || 17.4 || 1.8 km || multiple || 2000–2020 || 14 Dec 2020 || 53 || align=left | Disc.: SDSS || 
|- id="2000 TK78" bgcolor=#fefefe
| 0 ||  || MBA-I || 18.4 || data-sort-value="0.62" | 620 m || multiple || 2000–2018 || 06 Oct 2018 || 39 || align=left | Disc.: Spacewatch || 
|- id="2000 TL78" bgcolor=#d6d6d6
| 0 ||  || MBA-O || 16.98 || 2.2 km || multiple || 2000–2021 || 31 Mar 2021 || 131 || align=left | Disc.: SDSS || 
|- id="2000 TM78" bgcolor=#d6d6d6
| 0 ||  || MBA-O || 16.82 || 2.4 km || multiple || 2000–2021 || 31 May 2021 || 36 || align=left | Disc.: SDSS || 
|- id="2000 TN78" bgcolor=#E9E9E9
| 0 ||  || MBA-M || 18.38 || data-sort-value="0.89" | 890 m || multiple || 2000–2021 || 06 Oct 2021 || 54 || align=left | Disc.: Spacewatch || 
|- id="2000 TO78" bgcolor=#E9E9E9
| 0 ||  || MBA-M || 17.45 || 1.4 km || multiple || 2000–2021 || 29 Oct 2021 || 81 || align=left | Disc.: SDSS || 
|- id="2000 TP78" bgcolor=#d6d6d6
| 0 ||  || MBA-O || 17.1 || 2.1 km || multiple || 1999–2017 || 10 Oct 2017 || 32 || align=left | Disc.: SDSS || 
|- id="2000 TQ78" bgcolor=#E9E9E9
| 0 ||  || MBA-M || 17.67 || data-sort-value="0.87" | 870 m || multiple || 2000–2022 || 07 Jan 2022 || 91 || align=left | Disc.: SDSS || 
|- id="2000 TR78" bgcolor=#E9E9E9
| 0 ||  || MBA-M || 18.16 || data-sort-value="0.98" | 980 m || multiple || 2000–2021 || 07 Sep 2021 || 36 || align=left | Disc.: SDSS || 
|- id="2000 TS78" bgcolor=#d6d6d6
| 0 ||  || MBA-O || 17.2 || 2.0 km || multiple || 2000–2020 || 20 Apr 2020 || 35 || align=left | Disc.: Spacewatch || 
|- id="2000 TT78" bgcolor=#d6d6d6
| 0 ||  || MBA-O || 16.47 || 2.8 km || multiple || 2000–2021 || 06 Nov 2021 || 33 || align=left | Disc.: SDSS || 
|- id="2000 TU78" bgcolor=#fefefe
| 0 ||  || MBA-I || 18.8 || data-sort-value="0.52" | 520 m || multiple || 2000–2019 || 24 Aug 2019 || 27 || align=left | Disc.: SDSS || 
|- id="2000 TV78" bgcolor=#E9E9E9
| 0 ||  || MBA-M || 18.37 || data-sort-value="0.89" | 890 m || multiple || 2000–2021 || 26 Nov 2021 || 64 || align=left | Disc.: Spacewatch || 
|- id="2000 TW78" bgcolor=#E9E9E9
| 0 ||  || MBA-M || 16.6 || 2.7 km || multiple || 2000–2021 || 10 Jan 2021 || 107 || align=left | Disc.: SDSS || 
|- id="2000 TY78" bgcolor=#E9E9E9
| 0 ||  || MBA-M || 16.7 || 1.9 km || multiple || 2000–2020 || 17 May 2020 || 94 || align=left | Disc.: SDSS || 
|- id="2000 TZ78" bgcolor=#E9E9E9
| 0 ||  || MBA-M || 17.2 || 1.1 km || multiple || 2000–2020 || 06 Dec 2020 || 134 || align=left | Disc.: Spacewatch || 
|- id="2000 TA79" bgcolor=#fefefe
| 1 ||  || MBA-I || 18.7 || data-sort-value="0.54" | 540 m || multiple || 2000–2019 || 02 Jan 2019 || 61 || align=left | Disc.: SDSS || 
|- id="2000 TB79" bgcolor=#E9E9E9
| 0 ||  || MBA-M || 17.2 || 1.5 km || multiple || 1996–2020 || 17 Apr 2020 || 83 || align=left | Disc.: Spacewatch || 
|- id="2000 TC79" bgcolor=#C2FFFF
| 0 ||  || JT || 13.7 || 10 km || multiple || 2000–2020 || 21 May 2020 || 72 || align=left | Disc.: SpacewatchTrojan camp (L5) || 
|- id="2000 TD79" bgcolor=#d6d6d6
| 0 ||  || MBA-O || 16.9 || 2.3 km || multiple || 2000–2019 || 31 Oct 2019 || 62 || align=left | Disc.: Spacewatch || 
|- id="2000 TE79" bgcolor=#E9E9E9
| 0 ||  || MBA-M || 17.58 || 1.7 km || multiple || 2000–2021 || 03 Apr 2021 || 71 || align=left | Disc.: SDSS || 
|- id="2000 TF79" bgcolor=#fefefe
| 0 ||  || MBA-I || 18.3 || data-sort-value="0.65" | 650 m || multiple || 2000–2019 || 30 Nov 2019 || 67 || align=left | Disc.: Spacewatch || 
|- id="2000 TG79" bgcolor=#fefefe
| 0 ||  || MBA-I || 18.1 || data-sort-value="0.71" | 710 m || multiple || 2000–2019 || 27 Nov 2019 || 59 || align=left | Disc.: LONEOS || 
|- id="2000 TH79" bgcolor=#d6d6d6
| 0 ||  || MBA-O || 16.83 || 2.4 km || multiple || 2000–2021 || 02 Dec 2021 || 111 || align=left | Disc.: SDSS || 
|- id="2000 TL79" bgcolor=#E9E9E9
| 0 ||  || MBA-M || 17.5 || 1.8 km || multiple || 2000–2018 || 03 Oct 2018 || 52 || align=left | Disc.: SDSS || 
|- id="2000 TN79" bgcolor=#fefefe
| 0 ||  || MBA-I || 18.3 || data-sort-value="0.65" | 650 m || multiple || 1999–2019 || 25 Sep 2019 || 60 || align=left | Disc.: SDSS || 
|- id="2000 TO79" bgcolor=#E9E9E9
| 0 ||  || MBA-M || 17.88 || 1.1 km || multiple || 2000–2021 || 10 Aug 2021 || 63 || align=left | Disc.: SDSS || 
|- id="2000 TP79" bgcolor=#fefefe
| 0 ||  || MBA-I || 17.6 || data-sort-value="0.90" | 900 m || multiple || 2000–2019 || 24 Oct 2019 || 53 || align=left | Disc.: Spacewatch || 
|- id="2000 TR79" bgcolor=#d6d6d6
| 0 ||  || MBA-O || 16.55 || 2.7 km || multiple || 2000–2021 || 30 Sep 2021 || 89 || align=left | Disc.: SpacewatchAlt.: 2010 JD194 || 
|- id="2000 TS79" bgcolor=#E9E9E9
| 0 ||  || MBA-M || 17.1 || 2.1 km || multiple || 2000–2021 || 18 Jan 2021 || 63 || align=left | Disc.: SDSS || 
|- id="2000 TV79" bgcolor=#fefefe
| 1 ||  || MBA-I || 18.4 || data-sort-value="0.62" | 620 m || multiple || 2000–2019 || 02 Nov 2019 || 52 || align=left | Disc.: Spacewatch || 
|- id="2000 TX79" bgcolor=#E9E9E9
| 0 ||  || MBA-M || 18.00 || 1.4 km || multiple || 2000–2021 || 15 Apr 2021 || 44 || align=left | Disc.: Spacewatch || 
|- id="2000 TA80" bgcolor=#fefefe
| 0 ||  || MBA-I || 18.2 || data-sort-value="0.68" | 680 m || multiple || 2000–2021 || 17 Jan 2021 || 55 || align=left | Disc.: SDSS || 
|- id="2000 TB80" bgcolor=#d6d6d6
| 0 ||  || MBA-O || 16.6 || 2.7 km || multiple || 2000–2020 || 21 Apr 2020 || 59 || align=left | Disc.: Spacewatch || 
|- id="2000 TC80" bgcolor=#d6d6d6
| 0 ||  || MBA-O || 16.5 || 2.8 km || multiple || 2000–2021 || 15 Jan 2021 || 52 || align=left | Disc.: Mauna Kea Obs. || 
|- id="2000 TD80" bgcolor=#E9E9E9
| 0 ||  || MBA-M || 17.7 || 1.2 km || multiple || 2000–2020 || 22 Apr 2020 || 59 || align=left | Disc.: SDSS || 
|- id="2000 TE80" bgcolor=#d6d6d6
| 0 ||  || MBA-O || 16.5 || 2.8 km || multiple || 2000–2020 || 22 Apr 2020 || 54 || align=left | Disc.: SDSS || 
|- id="2000 TG80" bgcolor=#FA8072
| 1 ||  || MCA || 19.1 || data-sort-value="0.45" | 450 m || multiple || 2000–2019 || 28 Nov 2019 || 48 || align=left | Disc.: Spacewatch || 
|- id="2000 TH80" bgcolor=#C2FFFF
| 0 ||  || JT || 14.57 || 6.8 km || multiple || 2000–2021 || 14 Jul 2021 || 83 || align=left | Disc.: SDSSTrojan camp (L5) || 
|- id="2000 TJ80" bgcolor=#d6d6d6
| 0 ||  || MBA-O || 16.6 || 2.7 km || multiple || 2000–2020 || 22 Mar 2020 || 41 || align=left | Disc.: SDSS || 
|- id="2000 TK80" bgcolor=#E9E9E9
| 0 ||  || MBA-M || 17.74 || data-sort-value="0.84" | 840 m || multiple || 2000–2021 || 30 Nov 2021 || 80 || align=left | Disc.: SDSS || 
|- id="2000 TL80" bgcolor=#d6d6d6
| 0 ||  || MBA-O || 16.96 || 2.3 km || multiple || 2000–2021 || 10 Sep 2021 || 41 || align=left | Disc.: SDSS || 
|- id="2000 TM80" bgcolor=#fefefe
| 0 ||  || MBA-I || 19.3 || data-sort-value="0.41" | 410 m || multiple || 2000–2019 || 26 Oct 2019 || 32 || align=left | Disc.: SDSS || 
|- id="2000 TN80" bgcolor=#E9E9E9
| 0 ||  || MBA-M || 18.31 || data-sort-value="0.65" | 650 m || multiple || 2000–2022 || 09 Jan 2022 || 43 || align=left | Disc.: SDSS || 
|- id="2000 TO80" bgcolor=#fefefe
| 0 ||  || MBA-I || 18.6 || data-sort-value="0.57" | 570 m || multiple || 2000–2018 || 14 Aug 2018 || 29 || align=left | Disc.: SDSS || 
|- id="2000 TP80" bgcolor=#E9E9E9
| 0 ||  || MBA-M || 18.37 || data-sort-value="0.63" | 630 m || multiple || 2000–2022 || 25 Jan 2022 || 38 || align=left | Disc.: SDSS || 
|- id="2000 TQ80" bgcolor=#E9E9E9
| 0 ||  || MBA-M || 17.49 || 1.3 km || multiple || 2000–2022 || 03 Nov 2022 || 42 || align=left | Disc.: Spacewatch || 
|- id="2000 TR80" bgcolor=#fefefe
| 1 ||  || MBA-I || 18.2 || data-sort-value="0.68" | 680 m || multiple || 2000–2019 || 20 Dec 2019 || 41 || align=left | Disc.: SDSS || 
|- id="2000 TU80" bgcolor=#C2FFFF
| 0 ||  || JT || 14.1 || 8.4 km || multiple || 2000–2019 || 02 May 2019 || 63 || align=left | Disc.: SDSSTrojan camp (L5) || 
|- id="2000 TV80" bgcolor=#C2FFFF
| 0 ||  || JT || 14.4 || 7.3 km || multiple || 2000–2020 || 21 Jun 2020 || 66 || align=left | Disc.: SDSSTrojan camp (L5) || 
|- id="2000 TX80" bgcolor=#C2FFFF
| 0 ||  || JT || 14.26 || 7.8 km || multiple || 2000–2021 || 08 Aug 2021 || 161 || align=left | Disc.: SDSSTrojan camp (L5)Alt.: 2015 YD7 || 
|- id="2000 TY80" bgcolor=#fefefe
| 0 ||  || MBA-I || 18.1 || data-sort-value="0.71" | 710 m || multiple || 2000–2020 || 13 Sep 2020 || 76 || align=left | Disc.: SDSS || 
|- id="2000 TZ80" bgcolor=#d6d6d6
| 0 ||  || MBA-O || 16.47 || 2.8 km || multiple || 2000–2021 || 17 Apr 2021 || 76 || align=left | Disc.: SDSS || 
|- id="2000 TB81" bgcolor=#C2FFFF
| 0 ||  || JT || 14.4 || 7.3 km || multiple || 2000–2020 || 23 May 2020 || 61 || align=left | Disc.: SDSSTrojan camp (L5) || 
|- id="2000 TC81" bgcolor=#d6d6d6
| 0 ||  || MBA-O || 16.11 || 3.3 km || multiple || 2000–2021 || 27 Oct 2021 || 143 || align=left | Disc.: SDSSAlt.: 2010 KH55 || 
|- id="2000 TE81" bgcolor=#E9E9E9
| 0 ||  || MBA-M || 17.5 || 1.8 km || multiple || 2000–2018 || 18 Aug 2018 || 38 || align=left | Disc.: SDSS || 
|- id="2000 TF81" bgcolor=#d6d6d6
| 0 ||  || MBA-O || 17.1 || 2.1 km || multiple || 2000–2020 || 22 Apr 2020 || 38 || align=left | Disc.: Spacewatch || 
|- id="2000 TG81" bgcolor=#d6d6d6
| 0 ||  || MBA-O || 17.4 || 1.8 km || multiple || 2000–2019 || 25 Sep 2019 || 38 || align=left | Disc.: SDSS || 
|- id="2000 TH81" bgcolor=#fefefe
| 0 ||  || MBA-I || 18.78 || data-sort-value="0.52" | 520 m || multiple || 2000–2021 || 30 Apr 2021 || 49 || align=left | Disc.: SDSS || 
|- id="2000 TJ81" bgcolor=#fefefe
| 0 ||  || MBA-I || 19.0 || data-sort-value="0.47" | 470 m || multiple || 2000–2021 || 15 Jan 2021 || 45 || align=left | Disc.: SDSS || 
|- id="2000 TL81" bgcolor=#d6d6d6
| 0 ||  || MBA-O || 16.87 || 2.4 km || multiple || 1995–2021 || 15 Apr 2021 || 79 || align=left | Disc.: SDSS || 
|- id="2000 TM81" bgcolor=#fefefe
| 0 ||  || MBA-I || 18.4 || data-sort-value="0.62" | 620 m || multiple || 2000–2018 || 08 Mar 2018 || 41 || align=left | Disc.: SDSS || 
|- id="2000 TN81" bgcolor=#E9E9E9
| 0 ||  || MBA-M || 18.2 || data-sort-value="0.96" | 960 m || multiple || 1996–2017 || 13 Sep 2017 || 40 || align=left | Disc.: SpacewatchAlt.: 1996 VK27 || 
|- id="2000 TO81" bgcolor=#d6d6d6
| 0 ||  || MBA-O || 17.3 || 1.9 km || multiple || 2000–2018 || 11 Feb 2018 || 33 || align=left | Disc.: SDSS || 
|- id="2000 TP81" bgcolor=#E9E9E9
| 0 ||  || MBA-M || 17.3 || 1.9 km || multiple || 2000–2020 || 24 Jan 2020 || 109 || align=left | Disc.: Spacewatch || 
|- id="2000 TQ81" bgcolor=#fefefe
| 0 ||  = (619218) || MBA-I || 17.7 || data-sort-value="0.86" | 860 m || multiple || 2000–2020 || 31 Jan 2020 || 81 || align=left | Disc.: Spacewatch || 
|- id="2000 TR81" bgcolor=#d6d6d6
| 0 ||  || MBA-O || 16.92 || 2.3 km || multiple || 2000–2021 || 11 Sep 2021 || 103 || align=left | Disc.: SDSS || 
|- id="2000 TS81" bgcolor=#fefefe
| 0 ||  || MBA-I || 18.2 || data-sort-value="0.68" | 680 m || multiple || 2000–2019 || 04 Nov 2019 || 52 || align=left | Disc.: SDSS || 
|- id="2000 TU81" bgcolor=#E9E9E9
| 0 ||  || MBA-M || 18.0 || data-sort-value="0.75" | 750 m || multiple || 2000–2020 || 08 Nov 2020 || 92 || align=left | Disc.: Spacewatch || 
|- id="2000 TV81" bgcolor=#d6d6d6
| 0 ||  || MBA-O || 16.85 || 2.4 km || multiple || 2000–2021 || 28 Sep 2021 || 106 || align=left | Disc.: SDSS || 
|- id="2000 TW81" bgcolor=#d6d6d6
| 0 ||  = (619219) || MBA-O || 16.9 || 2.3 km || multiple || 2000–2020 || 25 Apr 2020 || 52 || align=left | Disc.: SDSS || 
|- id="2000 TX81" bgcolor=#C2FFFF
| 0 ||  || JT || 14.27 || 7.8 km || multiple || 2000–2021 || 01 Jul 2021 || 126 || align=left | Disc.: SDSSTrojan camp (L5) || 
|- id="2000 TY81" bgcolor=#E9E9E9
| 0 ||  || MBA-M || 17.66 || 1.6 km || multiple || 2000–2021 || 13 Apr 2021 || 53 || align=left | Disc.: SDSS || 
|- id="2000 TZ81" bgcolor=#fefefe
| 0 ||  || MBA-I || 18.6 || data-sort-value="0.57" | 570 m || multiple || 2000–2019 || 25 Oct 2019 || 41 || align=left | Disc.: SDSS || 
|- id="2000 TA82" bgcolor=#E9E9E9
| 0 ||  || MBA-M || 17.4 || 1.8 km || multiple || 2000–2019 || 08 Nov 2019 || 38 || align=left | Disc.: SDSS || 
|- id="2000 TB82" bgcolor=#fefefe
| 0 ||  || MBA-I || 17.99 || data-sort-value="0.75" | 750 m || multiple || 2000–2021 || 06 Nov 2021 || 89 || align=left | Disc.: SDSS || 
|- id="2000 TC82" bgcolor=#fefefe
| 1 ||  || MBA-I || 18.8 || data-sort-value="0.52" | 520 m || multiple || 2000–2018 || 11 Aug 2018 || 26 || align=left | Disc.: Spacewatch || 
|- id="2000 TD82" bgcolor=#E9E9E9
| 0 ||  || MBA-M || 17.6 || 1.7 km || multiple || 2000–2021 || 22 Jan 2021 || 44 || align=left | Disc.: SDSS || 
|- id="2000 TF82" bgcolor=#d6d6d6
| 0 ||  || MBA-O || 17.11 || 2.1 km || multiple || 2000–2021 || 24 Nov 2021 || 104 || align=left | Disc.: DB MissingAdded on 22 July 2020 || 
|- id="2000 TG82" bgcolor=#E9E9E9
| 0 ||  || MBA-M || 17.8 || 1.2 km || multiple || 2000–2018 || 15 Dec 2018 || 28 || align=left | Disc.: No observationsAdded on 19 October 2020 || 
|- id="2000 TH82" bgcolor=#E9E9E9
| 1 ||  || MBA-M || 18.16 || data-sort-value="0.96" | 980 m || multiple || 2000–2022 || 02 Oct 2022 || 61 || align=left | Disc.: LONEOSAdded on 21 August 2021 || 
|- id="2000 TJ82" bgcolor=#fefefe
| 0 ||  || MBA-I || 18.98 || data-sort-value="0.48" | 480 m || multiple || 2000–2021 || 28 Nov 2021 || 85 || align=left | Disc.: SpacewatchAdded on 24 December 2021 || 
|- id="2000 TK82" bgcolor=#E9E9E9
| 0 ||  || MBA-M || 18.1 || 1.3 km || multiple || 2000–2020 || 26 Jan 2020 || 26 || align=left | Disc.: SDSSAdded on 24 December 2021 || 
|}
back to top

References 
 

Lists of unnumbered minor planets